

550001–550100 

|-bgcolor=#d6d6d6
| 550001 ||  || — || October 23, 2011 || Kitt Peak || Spacewatch || 7:4 || align=right | 2.9 km || 
|-id=002 bgcolor=#E9E9E9
| 550002 ||  || — || October 6, 2002 || Palomar || NEAT ||  || align=right | 1.8 km || 
|-id=003 bgcolor=#d6d6d6
| 550003 ||  || — || November 20, 2006 || Kitt Peak || Spacewatch ||  || align=right | 2.0 km || 
|-id=004 bgcolor=#E9E9E9
| 550004 ||  || — || February 11, 2004 || Palomar || NEAT ||  || align=right | 1.5 km || 
|-id=005 bgcolor=#E9E9E9
| 550005 ||  || — || December 26, 2003 || Piszkesteto || K. Sárneczky ||  || align=right | 1.5 km || 
|-id=006 bgcolor=#E9E9E9
| 550006 ||  || — || November 25, 2011 || Haleakala || Pan-STARRS ||  || align=right | 1.4 km || 
|-id=007 bgcolor=#E9E9E9
| 550007 ||  || — || November 23, 2011 || Mount Lemmon || Mount Lemmon Survey ||  || align=right data-sort-value="0.72" | 720 m || 
|-id=008 bgcolor=#E9E9E9
| 550008 ||  || — || February 5, 2017 || Mount Lemmon || Mount Lemmon Survey ||  || align=right | 1.5 km || 
|-id=009 bgcolor=#fefefe
| 550009 ||  || — || March 19, 2013 || Haleakala || Pan-STARRS ||  || align=right | 1.1 km || 
|-id=010 bgcolor=#fefefe
| 550010 ||  || — || November 18, 2011 || Mount Lemmon || Mount Lemmon Survey ||  || align=right data-sort-value="0.62" | 620 m || 
|-id=011 bgcolor=#E9E9E9
| 550011 ||  || — || November 26, 2011 || Mount Lemmon || Mount Lemmon Survey ||  || align=right | 2.3 km || 
|-id=012 bgcolor=#fefefe
| 550012 ||  || — || April 9, 2013 || Haleakala || Pan-STARRS || H || align=right data-sort-value="0.57" | 570 m || 
|-id=013 bgcolor=#E9E9E9
| 550013 ||  || — || March 19, 2017 || Mount Lemmon || Mount Lemmon Survey ||  || align=right | 1.4 km || 
|-id=014 bgcolor=#E9E9E9
| 550014 ||  || — || November 3, 2015 || Mount Lemmon || Mount Lemmon Survey ||  || align=right data-sort-value="0.90" | 900 m || 
|-id=015 bgcolor=#C2FFFF
| 550015 ||  || — || November 24, 2011 || Mount Lemmon || Mount Lemmon Survey || L4 || align=right | 6.4 km || 
|-id=016 bgcolor=#E9E9E9
| 550016 ||  || — || July 4, 2014 || Haleakala || Pan-STARRS ||  || align=right | 1.5 km || 
|-id=017 bgcolor=#fefefe
| 550017 ||  || — || April 1, 2015 || Mount Lemmon || Mount Lemmon Survey || H || align=right data-sort-value="0.67" | 670 m || 
|-id=018 bgcolor=#E9E9E9
| 550018 ||  || — || November 24, 2011 || Mount Lemmon || Mount Lemmon Survey ||  || align=right | 1.2 km || 
|-id=019 bgcolor=#E9E9E9
| 550019 ||  || — || May 21, 2014 || Haleakala || Pan-STARRS ||  || align=right | 1.4 km || 
|-id=020 bgcolor=#E9E9E9
| 550020 ||  || — || November 7, 2015 || Haleakala || Pan-STARRS ||  || align=right | 1.3 km || 
|-id=021 bgcolor=#E9E9E9
| 550021 ||  || — || November 23, 2011 || Mount Lemmon || Mount Lemmon Survey ||  || align=right data-sort-value="0.68" | 680 m || 
|-id=022 bgcolor=#E9E9E9
| 550022 ||  || — || November 18, 2011 || Mount Lemmon || Mount Lemmon Survey ||  || align=right | 1.6 km || 
|-id=023 bgcolor=#E9E9E9
| 550023 ||  || — || August 29, 2006 || Kitt Peak || Spacewatch ||  || align=right | 1.8 km || 
|-id=024 bgcolor=#E9E9E9
| 550024 ||  || — || November 27, 2011 || Mount Lemmon || Mount Lemmon Survey ||  || align=right | 1.6 km || 
|-id=025 bgcolor=#E9E9E9
| 550025 ||  || — || October 8, 2015 || Haleakala || Pan-STARRS ||  || align=right | 1.3 km || 
|-id=026 bgcolor=#E9E9E9
| 550026 ||  || — || December 6, 2011 || Haleakala || Pan-STARRS ||  || align=right | 1.6 km || 
|-id=027 bgcolor=#E9E9E9
| 550027 ||  || — || January 31, 2017 || Haleakala || Pan-STARRS ||  || align=right | 1.7 km || 
|-id=028 bgcolor=#E9E9E9
| 550028 ||  || — || December 6, 2011 || Haleakala || Pan-STARRS ||  || align=right | 1.0 km || 
|-id=029 bgcolor=#E9E9E9
| 550029 ||  || — || April 12, 2013 || Haleakala || Pan-STARRS ||  || align=right data-sort-value="0.75" | 750 m || 
|-id=030 bgcolor=#E9E9E9
| 550030 ||  || — || January 31, 2004 || Apache Point || SDSS Collaboration ||  || align=right | 2.2 km || 
|-id=031 bgcolor=#E9E9E9
| 550031 ||  || — || December 5, 2007 || Mount Lemmon || Mount Lemmon Survey ||  || align=right | 1.2 km || 
|-id=032 bgcolor=#E9E9E9
| 550032 ||  || — || November 30, 2011 || Mount Lemmon || Mount Lemmon Survey ||  || align=right | 1.2 km || 
|-id=033 bgcolor=#E9E9E9
| 550033 ||  || — || October 19, 2006 || Catalina || CSS ||  || align=right | 2.4 km || 
|-id=034 bgcolor=#E9E9E9
| 550034 ||  || — || December 22, 2011 || Oukaimeden || C. Rinner ||  || align=right | 1.2 km || 
|-id=035 bgcolor=#d6d6d6
| 550035 ||  || — || January 28, 2007 || Kitt Peak || Spacewatch ||  || align=right | 3.4 km || 
|-id=036 bgcolor=#d6d6d6
| 550036 ||  || — || December 24, 2011 || Mount Lemmon || Mount Lemmon Survey ||  || align=right | 2.8 km || 
|-id=037 bgcolor=#E9E9E9
| 550037 ||  || — || December 24, 2011 || Mount Lemmon || Mount Lemmon Survey ||  || align=right | 1.3 km || 
|-id=038 bgcolor=#E9E9E9
| 550038 ||  || — || December 17, 2007 || Mount Lemmon || Mount Lemmon Survey ||  || align=right | 1.4 km || 
|-id=039 bgcolor=#E9E9E9
| 550039 ||  || — || December 6, 2011 || Haleakala || Pan-STARRS ||  || align=right | 1.2 km || 
|-id=040 bgcolor=#E9E9E9
| 550040 ||  || — || January 1, 2008 || Kitt Peak || Spacewatch ||  || align=right data-sort-value="0.94" | 940 m || 
|-id=041 bgcolor=#C2FFFF
| 550041 ||  || — || December 25, 2011 || Les Engarouines || L. Bernasconi || L4 || align=right | 8.6 km || 
|-id=042 bgcolor=#fefefe
| 550042 ||  || — || November 2, 2007 || Mount Lemmon || Mount Lemmon Survey ||  || align=right | 1.2 km || 
|-id=043 bgcolor=#fefefe
| 550043 ||  || — || December 30, 2008 || Kitt Peak || Spacewatch ||  || align=right data-sort-value="0.79" | 790 m || 
|-id=044 bgcolor=#E9E9E9
| 550044 ||  || — || October 15, 2001 || Palomar || NEAT ||  || align=right | 3.2 km || 
|-id=045 bgcolor=#E9E9E9
| 550045 ||  || — || November 7, 2002 || Kitt Peak || Kitt Peak Obs. || MIS || align=right | 2.5 km || 
|-id=046 bgcolor=#E9E9E9
| 550046 ||  || — || February 28, 2008 || Catalina || CSS ||  || align=right | 2.5 km || 
|-id=047 bgcolor=#E9E9E9
| 550047 ||  || — || December 22, 1998 || Kitt Peak || Spacewatch ||  || align=right | 1.7 km || 
|-id=048 bgcolor=#E9E9E9
| 550048 ||  || — || December 31, 2007 || Kitt Peak || Spacewatch ||  || align=right | 1.0 km || 
|-id=049 bgcolor=#E9E9E9
| 550049 ||  || — || August 7, 2010 || XuYi || PMO NEO ||  || align=right | 2.1 km || 
|-id=050 bgcolor=#d6d6d6
| 550050 ||  || — || September 3, 2010 || Mount Lemmon || Mount Lemmon Survey ||  || align=right | 2.7 km || 
|-id=051 bgcolor=#E9E9E9
| 550051 ||  || — || March 17, 2004 || Kitt Peak || Spacewatch ||  || align=right | 1.4 km || 
|-id=052 bgcolor=#E9E9E9
| 550052 ||  || — || September 14, 2006 || Kitt Peak || Spacewatch ||  || align=right | 1.0 km || 
|-id=053 bgcolor=#E9E9E9
| 550053 ||  || — || January 14, 2008 || Kitt Peak || Spacewatch ||  || align=right data-sort-value="0.86" | 860 m || 
|-id=054 bgcolor=#E9E9E9
| 550054 ||  || — || December 25, 2011 || Mount Lemmon || Mount Lemmon Survey ||  || align=right data-sort-value="0.98" | 980 m || 
|-id=055 bgcolor=#E9E9E9
| 550055 ||  || — || December 27, 2011 || Kitt Peak || Spacewatch ||  || align=right | 1.8 km || 
|-id=056 bgcolor=#E9E9E9
| 550056 ||  || — || January 17, 2004 || Palomar || NEAT ||  || align=right | 1.4 km || 
|-id=057 bgcolor=#E9E9E9
| 550057 ||  || — || December 19, 2007 || Mount Lemmon || Mount Lemmon Survey ||  || align=right | 1.8 km || 
|-id=058 bgcolor=#E9E9E9
| 550058 ||  || — || December 27, 2011 || Mount Lemmon || Mount Lemmon Survey ||  || align=right | 1.2 km || 
|-id=059 bgcolor=#d6d6d6
| 550059 ||  || — || August 31, 2005 || Campo Imperatore || A. Boattini ||  || align=right | 2.7 km || 
|-id=060 bgcolor=#E9E9E9
| 550060 ||  || — || December 29, 2011 || Kitt Peak || Spacewatch ||  || align=right | 2.0 km || 
|-id=061 bgcolor=#E9E9E9
| 550061 ||  || — || December 29, 2011 || Kitt Peak || Spacewatch ||  || align=right | 1.4 km || 
|-id=062 bgcolor=#E9E9E9
| 550062 ||  || — || December 26, 2011 || Marly || P. Kocher ||  || align=right | 1.7 km || 
|-id=063 bgcolor=#d6d6d6
| 550063 ||  || — || December 31, 2011 || Kitt Peak || Spacewatch ||  || align=right | 2.1 km || 
|-id=064 bgcolor=#C2FFFF
| 550064 ||  || — || December 31, 2011 || Kitt Peak || Spacewatch || L4 || align=right | 9.2 km || 
|-id=065 bgcolor=#E9E9E9
| 550065 ||  || — || March 9, 2008 || Kitt Peak || Spacewatch ||  || align=right | 1.4 km || 
|-id=066 bgcolor=#E9E9E9
| 550066 ||  || — || August 29, 2006 || Catalina || CSS ||  || align=right | 1.4 km || 
|-id=067 bgcolor=#E9E9E9
| 550067 ||  || — || December 17, 2011 || ESA OGS || ESA OGS ||  || align=right | 1.0 km || 
|-id=068 bgcolor=#E9E9E9
| 550068 ||  || — || December 30, 2011 || Kitt Peak || Spacewatch ||  || align=right | 1.9 km || 
|-id=069 bgcolor=#d6d6d6
| 550069 ||  || — || February 18, 2001 || Haleakala || AMOS ||  || align=right | 3.6 km || 
|-id=070 bgcolor=#FA8072
| 550070 ||  || — || October 9, 2002 || Socorro || LINEAR ||  || align=right | 1.5 km || 
|-id=071 bgcolor=#E9E9E9
| 550071 ||  || — || December 18, 2003 || Socorro || LINEAR ||  || align=right | 1.1 km || 
|-id=072 bgcolor=#d6d6d6
| 550072 ||  || — || January 24, 2012 || Haleakala || Pan-STARRS ||  || align=right | 2.2 km || 
|-id=073 bgcolor=#E9E9E9
| 550073 ||  || — || March 8, 2008 || Mount Lemmon || Mount Lemmon Survey ||  || align=right | 1.0 km || 
|-id=074 bgcolor=#E9E9E9
| 550074 ||  || — || December 27, 2011 || Kitt Peak || Spacewatch ||  || align=right | 1.7 km || 
|-id=075 bgcolor=#E9E9E9
| 550075 ||  || — || December 27, 2011 || Mount Lemmon || Mount Lemmon Survey ||  || align=right | 1.3 km || 
|-id=076 bgcolor=#fefefe
| 550076 ||  || — || December 28, 2011 || Mount Lemmon || Mount Lemmon Survey ||  || align=right data-sort-value="0.74" | 740 m || 
|-id=077 bgcolor=#d6d6d6
| 550077 ||  || — || December 27, 2011 || Mount Lemmon || Mount Lemmon Survey ||  || align=right | 3.1 km || 
|-id=078 bgcolor=#E9E9E9
| 550078 ||  || — || September 13, 2015 || Piszkesteto || K. Sárneczky ||  || align=right | 1.3 km || 
|-id=079 bgcolor=#E9E9E9
| 550079 ||  || — || December 27, 2011 || Kitt Peak || Spacewatch ||  || align=right | 1.8 km || 
|-id=080 bgcolor=#E9E9E9
| 550080 ||  || — || November 19, 2015 || Mount Lemmon || Mount Lemmon Survey ||  || align=right | 1.6 km || 
|-id=081 bgcolor=#E9E9E9
| 550081 ||  || — || April 12, 2013 || Haleakala || Pan-STARRS ||  || align=right | 1.6 km || 
|-id=082 bgcolor=#E9E9E9
| 550082 ||  || — || December 27, 2011 || Mount Lemmon || Mount Lemmon Survey ||  || align=right | 2.4 km || 
|-id=083 bgcolor=#E9E9E9
| 550083 ||  || — || December 31, 2011 || Piszkesteto || A. Szing ||  || align=right | 1.2 km || 
|-id=084 bgcolor=#E9E9E9
| 550084 ||  || — || December 31, 2011 || Kitt Peak || Spacewatch ||  || align=right | 1.1 km || 
|-id=085 bgcolor=#E9E9E9
| 550085 ||  || — || December 31, 2011 || Mount Lemmon || Mount Lemmon Survey ||  || align=right | 1.2 km || 
|-id=086 bgcolor=#E9E9E9
| 550086 ||  || — || April 1, 1995 || Kitt Peak || Spacewatch ||  || align=right | 1.7 km || 
|-id=087 bgcolor=#E9E9E9
| 550087 ||  || — || October 13, 1998 || Kitt Peak || Spacewatch ||  || align=right | 1.3 km || 
|-id=088 bgcolor=#C2FFFF
| 550088 ||  || — || December 29, 2011 || Mount Lemmon || Mount Lemmon Survey || L4 || align=right | 8.4 km || 
|-id=089 bgcolor=#E9E9E9
| 550089 ||  || — || December 29, 2011 || Mount Lemmon || Mount Lemmon Survey ||  || align=right data-sort-value="0.94" | 940 m || 
|-id=090 bgcolor=#E9E9E9
| 550090 ||  || — || March 1, 2008 || Kitt Peak || Spacewatch ||  || align=right | 1.7 km || 
|-id=091 bgcolor=#E9E9E9
| 550091 ||  || — || October 2, 2006 || Mount Lemmon || Mount Lemmon Survey ||  || align=right | 1.8 km || 
|-id=092 bgcolor=#E9E9E9
| 550092 ||  || — || January 1, 2012 || Mount Lemmon || Mount Lemmon Survey ||  || align=right | 1.1 km || 
|-id=093 bgcolor=#d6d6d6
| 550093 ||  || — || January 10, 2007 || Kitt Peak || Spacewatch ||  || align=right | 3.4 km || 
|-id=094 bgcolor=#fefefe
| 550094 ||  || — || August 28, 2005 || Siding Spring || SSS || H || align=right data-sort-value="0.90" | 900 m || 
|-id=095 bgcolor=#E9E9E9
| 550095 ||  || — || February 13, 2004 || Kitt Peak || Spacewatch ||  || align=right data-sort-value="0.98" | 980 m || 
|-id=096 bgcolor=#E9E9E9
| 550096 ||  || — || October 5, 2002 || Palomar || NEAT ||  || align=right data-sort-value="0.98" | 980 m || 
|-id=097 bgcolor=#E9E9E9
| 550097 ||  || — || October 31, 2002 || Socorro || LINEAR ||  || align=right | 2.0 km || 
|-id=098 bgcolor=#E9E9E9
| 550098 ||  || — || December 29, 2011 || Mount Lemmon || Mount Lemmon Survey ||  || align=right | 1.6 km || 
|-id=099 bgcolor=#E9E9E9
| 550099 ||  || — || November 24, 2011 || Haleakala || Pan-STARRS ||  || align=right | 1.7 km || 
|-id=100 bgcolor=#E9E9E9
| 550100 ||  || — || December 30, 2007 || Kitt Peak || Spacewatch ||  || align=right data-sort-value="0.90" | 900 m || 
|}

550101–550200 

|-bgcolor=#E9E9E9
| 550101 ||  || — || January 6, 2012 || Kitt Peak || Spacewatch ||  || align=right data-sort-value="0.79" | 790 m || 
|-id=102 bgcolor=#fefefe
| 550102 ||  || — || January 4, 2012 || Mount Lemmon || Mount Lemmon Survey ||  || align=right data-sort-value="0.57" | 570 m || 
|-id=103 bgcolor=#E9E9E9
| 550103 ||  || — || January 10, 2012 || Mount Lemmon || Mount Lemmon Survey ||  || align=right | 1.5 km || 
|-id=104 bgcolor=#E9E9E9
| 550104 ||  || — || January 1, 2012 || Mount Lemmon || Mount Lemmon Survey ||  || align=right data-sort-value="0.90" | 900 m || 
|-id=105 bgcolor=#E9E9E9
| 550105 ||  || — || January 21, 1999 || Caussols || ODAS ||  || align=right | 1.5 km || 
|-id=106 bgcolor=#C2FFFF
| 550106 ||  || — || January 2, 2012 || Kitt Peak || Spacewatch || L4 || align=right | 8.0 km || 
|-id=107 bgcolor=#d6d6d6
| 550107 ||  || — || January 2, 2012 || Mount Lemmon || Mount Lemmon Survey ||  || align=right | 2.6 km || 
|-id=108 bgcolor=#E9E9E9
| 550108 ||  || — || January 1, 2012 || Mount Lemmon || Mount Lemmon Survey ||  || align=right | 1.1 km || 
|-id=109 bgcolor=#d6d6d6
| 550109 ||  || — || January 3, 2012 || Mount Lemmon || Mount Lemmon Survey ||  || align=right | 2.6 km || 
|-id=110 bgcolor=#E9E9E9
| 550110 ||  || — || January 4, 2012 || Mount Lemmon || Mount Lemmon Survey ||  || align=right | 2.2 km || 
|-id=111 bgcolor=#E9E9E9
| 550111 ||  || — || December 29, 2011 || Kitt Peak || Spacewatch ||  || align=right | 1.5 km || 
|-id=112 bgcolor=#E9E9E9
| 550112 ||  || — || December 25, 2011 || Kitt Peak || Spacewatch ||  || align=right | 1.5 km || 
|-id=113 bgcolor=#E9E9E9
| 550113 ||  || — || December 26, 2011 || Kitt Peak || Spacewatch ||  || align=right | 1.6 km || 
|-id=114 bgcolor=#E9E9E9
| 550114 ||  || — || January 2, 2012 || Mount Lemmon || Mount Lemmon Survey ||  || align=right | 1.2 km || 
|-id=115 bgcolor=#E9E9E9
| 550115 ||  || — || October 20, 2006 || Kitt Peak || Spacewatch ||  || align=right | 1.5 km || 
|-id=116 bgcolor=#E9E9E9
| 550116 ||  || — || January 18, 2012 || Kitt Peak || Spacewatch ||  || align=right | 1.3 km || 
|-id=117 bgcolor=#fefefe
| 550117 ||  || — || September 11, 2007 || Mount Lemmon || Mount Lemmon Survey ||  || align=right data-sort-value="0.71" | 710 m || 
|-id=118 bgcolor=#E9E9E9
| 550118 ||  || — || July 30, 2000 || Cerro Tololo || M. W. Buie, S. D. Kern ||  || align=right | 2.9 km || 
|-id=119 bgcolor=#d6d6d6
| 550119 ||  || — || April 7, 2008 || Kitt Peak || Spacewatch ||  || align=right | 2.6 km || 
|-id=120 bgcolor=#E9E9E9
| 550120 ||  || — || February 22, 2003 || Palomar || NEAT ||  || align=right | 2.8 km || 
|-id=121 bgcolor=#E9E9E9
| 550121 ||  || — || December 29, 2011 || Mount Lemmon || Mount Lemmon Survey ||  || align=right | 1.5 km || 
|-id=122 bgcolor=#fefefe
| 550122 ||  || — || December 26, 2011 || Kitt Peak || Spacewatch || H || align=right data-sort-value="0.61" | 610 m || 
|-id=123 bgcolor=#E9E9E9
| 550123 ||  || — || October 5, 2002 || Palomar || NEAT || EUN || align=right | 1.5 km || 
|-id=124 bgcolor=#E9E9E9
| 550124 ||  || — || February 10, 2008 || Mount Lemmon || Mount Lemmon Survey ||  || align=right | 1.5 km || 
|-id=125 bgcolor=#E9E9E9
| 550125 ||  || — || January 19, 2012 || Haleakala || Pan-STARRS ||  || align=right | 1.8 km || 
|-id=126 bgcolor=#E9E9E9
| 550126 ||  || — || February 16, 2004 || Kitt Peak || Spacewatch ||  || align=right | 1.1 km || 
|-id=127 bgcolor=#d6d6d6
| 550127 ||  || — || August 23, 2004 || Kitt Peak || Spacewatch ||  || align=right | 2.9 km || 
|-id=128 bgcolor=#d6d6d6
| 550128 ||  || — || January 3, 2012 || Kitt Peak || Spacewatch ||  || align=right | 2.7 km || 
|-id=129 bgcolor=#d6d6d6
| 550129 ||  || — || February 19, 2001 || Socorro || LINEAR ||  || align=right | 4.2 km || 
|-id=130 bgcolor=#E9E9E9
| 550130 ||  || — || November 2, 2006 || Mount Lemmon || Mount Lemmon Survey ||  || align=right | 2.3 km || 
|-id=131 bgcolor=#d6d6d6
| 550131 ||  || — || November 4, 2010 || Mount Lemmon || Mount Lemmon Survey ||  || align=right | 2.2 km || 
|-id=132 bgcolor=#d6d6d6
| 550132 ||  || — || January 19, 2012 || Mount Lemmon || Mount Lemmon Survey ||  || align=right | 2.8 km || 
|-id=133 bgcolor=#fefefe
| 550133 ||  || — || September 15, 2010 || Mount Lemmon || Mount Lemmon Survey ||  || align=right data-sort-value="0.75" | 750 m || 
|-id=134 bgcolor=#d6d6d6
| 550134 ||  || — || January 19, 2012 || Mount Lemmon || Mount Lemmon Survey ||  || align=right | 2.7 km || 
|-id=135 bgcolor=#E9E9E9
| 550135 ||  || — || December 30, 2011 || Kitt Peak || Spacewatch ||  || align=right | 1.6 km || 
|-id=136 bgcolor=#E9E9E9
| 550136 ||  || — || January 19, 2012 || Mount Lemmon || Mount Lemmon Survey ||  || align=right | 1.0 km || 
|-id=137 bgcolor=#d6d6d6
| 550137 ||  || — || January 19, 2012 || Mount Lemmon || Mount Lemmon Survey || 3:2 || align=right | 3.9 km || 
|-id=138 bgcolor=#E9E9E9
| 550138 ||  || — || July 7, 2005 || Mauna Kea || Mauna Kea Obs. ||  || align=right | 1.2 km || 
|-id=139 bgcolor=#E9E9E9
| 550139 ||  || — || September 18, 2006 || Mauna Kea || Q. s. observers ||  || align=right | 1.2 km || 
|-id=140 bgcolor=#E9E9E9
| 550140 ||  || — || February 21, 2003 || Palomar || NEAT ||  || align=right | 2.5 km || 
|-id=141 bgcolor=#E9E9E9
| 550141 ||  || — || December 26, 2006 || Catalina || CSS ||  || align=right | 2.9 km || 
|-id=142 bgcolor=#E9E9E9
| 550142 ||  || — || January 21, 2012 || Haleakala || Pan-STARRS ||  || align=right | 1.9 km || 
|-id=143 bgcolor=#E9E9E9
| 550143 ||  || — || January 21, 2012 || Haleakala || Pan-STARRS ||  || align=right | 1.6 km || 
|-id=144 bgcolor=#E9E9E9
| 550144 ||  || — || February 18, 2008 || Mount Lemmon || Mount Lemmon Survey ||  || align=right data-sort-value="0.94" | 940 m || 
|-id=145 bgcolor=#d6d6d6
| 550145 ||  || — || January 18, 2012 || Mount Lemmon || Mount Lemmon Survey ||  || align=right | 2.8 km || 
|-id=146 bgcolor=#E9E9E9
| 550146 ||  || — || January 25, 2012 || Haleakala || Pan-STARRS ||  || align=right | 1.7 km || 
|-id=147 bgcolor=#d6d6d6
| 550147 ||  || — || December 7, 2005 || Kitt Peak || Spacewatch ||  || align=right | 2.9 km || 
|-id=148 bgcolor=#d6d6d6
| 550148 ||  || — || December 29, 2011 || Kitt Peak || Spacewatch ||  || align=right | 2.6 km || 
|-id=149 bgcolor=#E9E9E9
| 550149 ||  || — || November 2, 2011 || Mount Lemmon || Mount Lemmon Survey ||  || align=right | 2.1 km || 
|-id=150 bgcolor=#fefefe
| 550150 ||  || — || October 8, 2004 || Kitt Peak || Spacewatch ||  || align=right data-sort-value="0.78" | 780 m || 
|-id=151 bgcolor=#E9E9E9
| 550151 ||  || — || January 30, 2003 || Haleakala || AMOS ||  || align=right | 2.4 km || 
|-id=152 bgcolor=#E9E9E9
| 550152 ||  || — || September 28, 2006 || Catalina || CSS ||  || align=right | 1.6 km || 
|-id=153 bgcolor=#E9E9E9
| 550153 ||  || — || January 4, 2012 || Kitt Peak || Spacewatch ||  || align=right | 2.0 km || 
|-id=154 bgcolor=#E9E9E9
| 550154 ||  || — || May 3, 2005 || Kitt Peak || Spacewatch ||  || align=right data-sort-value="0.90" | 900 m || 
|-id=155 bgcolor=#E9E9E9
| 550155 ||  || — || March 29, 2008 || Catalina || CSS ||  || align=right | 1.5 km || 
|-id=156 bgcolor=#E9E9E9
| 550156 ||  || — || September 30, 2006 || Mount Lemmon || Mount Lemmon Survey ||  || align=right | 2.3 km || 
|-id=157 bgcolor=#d6d6d6
| 550157 ||  || — || December 19, 2011 || Oukaimeden || M. Ory ||  || align=right | 3.8 km || 
|-id=158 bgcolor=#E9E9E9
| 550158 ||  || — || January 26, 2012 || Kitt Peak || Spacewatch ||  || align=right | 1.4 km || 
|-id=159 bgcolor=#E9E9E9
| 550159 ||  || — || January 14, 2012 || Kitt Peak || Spacewatch ||  || align=right | 1.2 km || 
|-id=160 bgcolor=#fefefe
| 550160 ||  || — || November 14, 2007 || Kitt Peak || Spacewatch ||  || align=right data-sort-value="0.79" | 790 m || 
|-id=161 bgcolor=#E9E9E9
| 550161 ||  || — || January 26, 2012 || Mount Lemmon || Mount Lemmon Survey ||  || align=right | 1.6 km || 
|-id=162 bgcolor=#d6d6d6
| 550162 ||  || — || February 7, 2002 || Palomar || NEAT ||  || align=right | 3.2 km || 
|-id=163 bgcolor=#d6d6d6
| 550163 ||  || — || November 28, 2011 || Mount Lemmon || Mount Lemmon Survey ||  || align=right | 3.4 km || 
|-id=164 bgcolor=#E9E9E9
| 550164 ||  || — || December 24, 2011 || Mount Lemmon || Mount Lemmon Survey ||  || align=right | 1.5 km || 
|-id=165 bgcolor=#E9E9E9
| 550165 ||  || — || March 8, 2003 || Nogales || P. R. Holvorcem, M. Schwartz ||  || align=right | 1.8 km || 
|-id=166 bgcolor=#E9E9E9
| 550166 ||  || — || January 27, 2012 || Kitt Peak || Spacewatch ||  || align=right | 1.2 km || 
|-id=167 bgcolor=#E9E9E9
| 550167 ||  || — || December 18, 2011 || Les Engarouines || L. Bernasconi ||  || align=right | 1.8 km || 
|-id=168 bgcolor=#E9E9E9
| 550168 ||  || — || January 18, 2012 || Kitt Peak || Spacewatch ||  || align=right | 1.2 km || 
|-id=169 bgcolor=#E9E9E9
| 550169 ||  || — || December 12, 2002 || Palomar || NEAT ||  || align=right | 1.7 km || 
|-id=170 bgcolor=#E9E9E9
| 550170 ||  || — || January 27, 2012 || Mount Lemmon || Mount Lemmon Survey ||  || align=right | 2.2 km || 
|-id=171 bgcolor=#E9E9E9
| 550171 ||  || — || February 7, 2008 || Kitt Peak || Spacewatch ||  || align=right | 1.7 km || 
|-id=172 bgcolor=#d6d6d6
| 550172 ||  || — || December 30, 2011 || Kitt Peak || Spacewatch ||  || align=right | 2.1 km || 
|-id=173 bgcolor=#fefefe
| 550173 ||  || — || January 27, 2012 || Mount Lemmon || Mount Lemmon Survey ||  || align=right data-sort-value="0.60" | 600 m || 
|-id=174 bgcolor=#E9E9E9
| 550174 ||  || — || February 8, 2008 || Kitt Peak || Spacewatch ||  || align=right data-sort-value="0.89" | 890 m || 
|-id=175 bgcolor=#fefefe
| 550175 ||  || — || June 14, 2010 || Mount Lemmon || Mount Lemmon Survey || H || align=right data-sort-value="0.56" | 560 m || 
|-id=176 bgcolor=#d6d6d6
| 550176 ||  || — || October 9, 2010 || Catalina || CSS ||  || align=right | 3.4 km || 
|-id=177 bgcolor=#d6d6d6
| 550177 ||  || — || November 22, 2011 || Mount Lemmon || Mount Lemmon Survey ||  || align=right | 4.5 km || 
|-id=178 bgcolor=#E9E9E9
| 550178 ||  || — || January 20, 2012 || Haleakala || Pan-STARRS ||  || align=right | 1.5 km || 
|-id=179 bgcolor=#E9E9E9
| 550179 ||  || — || April 12, 2008 || Catalina || CSS ||  || align=right | 1.6 km || 
|-id=180 bgcolor=#E9E9E9
| 550180 ||  || — || January 25, 2012 || Haleakala || Pan-STARRS || EUN || align=right | 1.4 km || 
|-id=181 bgcolor=#E9E9E9
| 550181 ||  || — || November 4, 2002 || Palomar || NEAT ||  || align=right | 1.5 km || 
|-id=182 bgcolor=#E9E9E9
| 550182 ||  || — || January 29, 2012 || Mount Lemmon || Mount Lemmon Survey ||  || align=right | 2.0 km || 
|-id=183 bgcolor=#E9E9E9
| 550183 ||  || — || January 20, 2012 || Catalina || CSS || EUN || align=right | 1.6 km || 
|-id=184 bgcolor=#E9E9E9
| 550184 ||  || — || December 31, 2007 || Mount Lemmon || Mount Lemmon Survey ||  || align=right | 2.0 km || 
|-id=185 bgcolor=#E9E9E9
| 550185 ||  || — || January 26, 2012 || Mount Lemmon || Mount Lemmon Survey ||  || align=right | 1.4 km || 
|-id=186 bgcolor=#E9E9E9
| 550186 ||  || — || January 29, 2012 || Kitt Peak || Spacewatch ||  || align=right | 1.9 km || 
|-id=187 bgcolor=#E9E9E9
| 550187 ||  || — || September 18, 2006 || Kitt Peak || Spacewatch ||  || align=right | 1.3 km || 
|-id=188 bgcolor=#E9E9E9
| 550188 ||  || — || April 5, 2003 || Kitt Peak || Spacewatch ||  || align=right | 2.5 km || 
|-id=189 bgcolor=#E9E9E9
| 550189 ||  || — || January 28, 2003 || Apache Point || SDSS Collaboration ||  || align=right | 2.1 km || 
|-id=190 bgcolor=#E9E9E9
| 550190 ||  || — || March 8, 2008 || Kitt Peak || Spacewatch ||  || align=right | 1.2 km || 
|-id=191 bgcolor=#E9E9E9
| 550191 ||  || — || January 30, 2012 || Mount Lemmon || Mount Lemmon Survey ||  || align=right | 2.0 km || 
|-id=192 bgcolor=#E9E9E9
| 550192 ||  || — || September 16, 2010 || Kitt Peak || Spacewatch ||  || align=right | 2.1 km || 
|-id=193 bgcolor=#E9E9E9
| 550193 ||  || — || January 30, 2012 || Kitt Peak || Spacewatch ||  || align=right | 2.5 km || 
|-id=194 bgcolor=#E9E9E9
| 550194 ||  || — || January 30, 2012 || Kitt Peak || Spacewatch ||  || align=right | 2.0 km || 
|-id=195 bgcolor=#E9E9E9
| 550195 ||  || — || January 30, 2012 || Kitt Peak || Spacewatch ||  || align=right | 1.9 km || 
|-id=196 bgcolor=#E9E9E9
| 550196 ||  || — || January 30, 2012 || Mount Lemmon || Mount Lemmon Survey ||  || align=right | 1.5 km || 
|-id=197 bgcolor=#E9E9E9
| 550197 ||  || — || January 21, 2012 || Kitt Peak || Spacewatch ||  || align=right | 2.3 km || 
|-id=198 bgcolor=#E9E9E9
| 550198 ||  || — || January 20, 2012 || Mount Lemmon || Mount Lemmon Survey ||  || align=right | 1.2 km || 
|-id=199 bgcolor=#E9E9E9
| 550199 ||  || — || January 21, 2012 || Kitt Peak || Spacewatch ||  || align=right | 1.6 km || 
|-id=200 bgcolor=#E9E9E9
| 550200 ||  || — || December 13, 2015 || Haleakala || Pan-STARRS ||  || align=right | 1.6 km || 
|}

550201–550300 

|-bgcolor=#E9E9E9
| 550201 ||  || — || January 19, 2012 || Haleakala || Pan-STARRS ||  || align=right | 1.2 km || 
|-id=202 bgcolor=#fefefe
| 550202 ||  || — || November 17, 2014 || Haleakala || Pan-STARRS ||  || align=right data-sort-value="0.49" | 490 m || 
|-id=203 bgcolor=#E9E9E9
| 550203 ||  || — || January 29, 2012 || Mount Lemmon || Mount Lemmon Survey ||  || align=right | 1.9 km || 
|-id=204 bgcolor=#E9E9E9
| 550204 ||  || — || December 9, 2015 || Haleakala || Pan-STARRS ||  || align=right | 1.2 km || 
|-id=205 bgcolor=#d6d6d6
| 550205 ||  || — || January 15, 2018 || Haleakala || Pan-STARRS ||  || align=right | 2.4 km || 
|-id=206 bgcolor=#E9E9E9
| 550206 ||  || — || January 21, 2012 || Catalina || CSS ||  || align=right | 1.5 km || 
|-id=207 bgcolor=#E9E9E9
| 550207 ||  || — || June 28, 2014 || Haleakala || Pan-STARRS ||  || align=right | 1.7 km || 
|-id=208 bgcolor=#E9E9E9
| 550208 ||  || — || January 19, 2012 || Kitt Peak || Spacewatch ||  || align=right | 2.0 km || 
|-id=209 bgcolor=#E9E9E9
| 550209 ||  || — || January 19, 2012 || Haleakala || Pan-STARRS ||  || align=right | 1.3 km || 
|-id=210 bgcolor=#E9E9E9
| 550210 ||  || — || January 25, 2012 || Kitt Peak || Spacewatch ||  || align=right | 2.3 km || 
|-id=211 bgcolor=#E9E9E9
| 550211 ||  || — || January 24, 2012 || Haleakala || Pan-STARRS ||  || align=right | 1.1 km || 
|-id=212 bgcolor=#d6d6d6
| 550212 ||  || — || January 26, 2012 || Mount Lemmon || Mount Lemmon Survey ||  || align=right | 2.0 km || 
|-id=213 bgcolor=#fefefe
| 550213 ||  || — || March 15, 2016 || Haleakala || Pan-STARRS ||  || align=right data-sort-value="0.61" | 610 m || 
|-id=214 bgcolor=#E9E9E9
| 550214 ||  || — || January 30, 2012 || Kitt Peak || Spacewatch ||  || align=right | 1.7 km || 
|-id=215 bgcolor=#fefefe
| 550215 ||  || — || January 18, 2012 || Mount Lemmon || Mount Lemmon Survey ||  || align=right data-sort-value="0.57" | 570 m || 
|-id=216 bgcolor=#E9E9E9
| 550216 ||  || — || January 19, 2012 || Haleakala || Pan-STARRS ||  || align=right | 1.8 km || 
|-id=217 bgcolor=#E9E9E9
| 550217 ||  || — || January 18, 2012 || Mount Lemmon || Mount Lemmon Survey ||  || align=right data-sort-value="0.98" | 980 m || 
|-id=218 bgcolor=#d6d6d6
| 550218 ||  || — || January 19, 2012 || Kitt Peak || Spacewatch ||  || align=right | 2.7 km || 
|-id=219 bgcolor=#E9E9E9
| 550219 ||  || — || January 21, 2012 || Kitt Peak || Spacewatch ||  || align=right | 1.2 km || 
|-id=220 bgcolor=#E9E9E9
| 550220 ||  || — || November 5, 2010 || Mount Lemmon || Mount Lemmon Survey ||  || align=right | 2.5 km || 
|-id=221 bgcolor=#E9E9E9
| 550221 ||  || — || August 27, 2009 || Kitt Peak || Spacewatch ||  || align=right | 1.9 km || 
|-id=222 bgcolor=#E9E9E9
| 550222 ||  || — || April 7, 2008 || Catalina || CSS ||  || align=right | 2.0 km || 
|-id=223 bgcolor=#E9E9E9
| 550223 ||  || — || March 10, 2003 || Kitt Peak || Spacewatch ||  || align=right | 1.7 km || 
|-id=224 bgcolor=#E9E9E9
| 550224 ||  || — || September 30, 2010 || Mount Lemmon || Mount Lemmon Survey || MRX || align=right data-sort-value="0.92" | 920 m || 
|-id=225 bgcolor=#E9E9E9
| 550225 ||  || — || October 10, 2006 || Palomar || NEAT || EUN || align=right | 1.3 km || 
|-id=226 bgcolor=#E9E9E9
| 550226 ||  || — || December 26, 2011 || Mount Lemmon || Mount Lemmon Survey ||  || align=right | 2.4 km || 
|-id=227 bgcolor=#E9E9E9
| 550227 ||  || — || April 16, 2004 || Palomar || NEAT ||  || align=right | 1.8 km || 
|-id=228 bgcolor=#E9E9E9
| 550228 ||  || — || January 19, 2012 || Haleakala || Pan-STARRS ||  || align=right | 1.8 km || 
|-id=229 bgcolor=#d6d6d6
| 550229 ||  || — || March 8, 2005 || Mount Lemmon || Mount Lemmon Survey || 3:2 || align=right | 3.9 km || 
|-id=230 bgcolor=#E9E9E9
| 550230 ||  || — || February 12, 2004 || Palomar || NEAT ||  || align=right | 1.3 km || 
|-id=231 bgcolor=#E9E9E9
| 550231 ||  || — || August 31, 2005 || Kitt Peak || Spacewatch || PAD || align=right | 1.8 km || 
|-id=232 bgcolor=#E9E9E9
| 550232 ||  || — || January 26, 2012 || Mount Lemmon || Mount Lemmon Survey ||  || align=right | 1.2 km || 
|-id=233 bgcolor=#E9E9E9
| 550233 ||  || — || November 19, 2006 || Catalina || CSS ||  || align=right | 1.7 km || 
|-id=234 bgcolor=#E9E9E9
| 550234 ||  || — || February 12, 2012 || Mount Lemmon || Mount Lemmon Survey ||  || align=right | 1.4 km || 
|-id=235 bgcolor=#E9E9E9
| 550235 ||  || — || October 29, 2010 || Mount Lemmon || Mount Lemmon Survey ||  || align=right | 2.1 km || 
|-id=236 bgcolor=#E9E9E9
| 550236 ||  || — || November 24, 2006 || Mount Lemmon || Mount Lemmon Survey ||  || align=right | 1.3 km || 
|-id=237 bgcolor=#E9E9E9
| 550237 ||  || — || February 12, 2012 || Mount Lemmon || Mount Lemmon Survey ||  || align=right | 2.5 km || 
|-id=238 bgcolor=#E9E9E9
| 550238 ||  || — || January 21, 2012 || Catalina || CSS ||  || align=right | 1.4 km || 
|-id=239 bgcolor=#E9E9E9
| 550239 ||  || — || February 14, 2012 || Haleakala || Pan-STARRS ||  || align=right | 1.5 km || 
|-id=240 bgcolor=#E9E9E9
| 550240 ||  || — || November 22, 2011 || Mount Lemmon || Mount Lemmon Survey ||  || align=right | 1.5 km || 
|-id=241 bgcolor=#d6d6d6
| 550241 ||  || — || November 1, 2010 || Mount Lemmon || Mount Lemmon Survey ||  || align=right | 2.3 km || 
|-id=242 bgcolor=#E9E9E9
| 550242 ||  || — || January 18, 2012 || Kitt Peak || Spacewatch ||  || align=right | 1.7 km || 
|-id=243 bgcolor=#E9E9E9
| 550243 ||  || — || October 19, 2006 || Kitt Peak || L. H. Wasserman ||  || align=right | 1.3 km || 
|-id=244 bgcolor=#E9E9E9
| 550244 ||  || — || January 19, 2012 || Haleakala || Pan-STARRS ||  || align=right | 2.3 km || 
|-id=245 bgcolor=#E9E9E9
| 550245 ||  || — || February 3, 2012 || Haleakala || Pan-STARRS ||  || align=right | 1.9 km || 
|-id=246 bgcolor=#E9E9E9
| 550246 ||  || — || January 27, 2012 || Kitt Peak || Spacewatch ||  || align=right | 1.9 km || 
|-id=247 bgcolor=#E9E9E9
| 550247 ||  || — || January 19, 2012 || Haleakala || Pan-STARRS ||  || align=right | 1.4 km || 
|-id=248 bgcolor=#fefefe
| 550248 ||  || — || January 19, 2012 || Kitt Peak || Spacewatch || H || align=right data-sort-value="0.60" | 600 m || 
|-id=249 bgcolor=#E9E9E9
| 550249 ||  || — || August 8, 2005 || Cerro Tololo || Cerro Tololo Obs. ||  || align=right | 2.0 km || 
|-id=250 bgcolor=#E9E9E9
| 550250 ||  || — || January 1, 2012 || Mount Lemmon || Mount Lemmon Survey ||  || align=right | 1.5 km || 
|-id=251 bgcolor=#d6d6d6
| 550251 ||  || — || January 21, 2012 || Kitt Peak || Spacewatch ||  || align=right | 2.2 km || 
|-id=252 bgcolor=#E9E9E9
| 550252 ||  || — || February 15, 2012 || Haleakala || Pan-STARRS ||  || align=right | 2.0 km || 
|-id=253 bgcolor=#E9E9E9
| 550253 ||  || — || February 15, 2012 || Haleakala || Pan-STARRS ||  || align=right | 2.7 km || 
|-id=254 bgcolor=#d6d6d6
| 550254 ||  || — || April 7, 2007 || Mount Lemmon || Mount Lemmon Survey || Tj (2.95) || align=right | 3.9 km || 
|-id=255 bgcolor=#E9E9E9
| 550255 ||  || — || January 19, 2012 || Haleakala || Pan-STARRS ||  || align=right | 1.9 km || 
|-id=256 bgcolor=#E9E9E9
| 550256 ||  || — || February 14, 2012 || Haleakala || Pan-STARRS ||  || align=right | 1.4 km || 
|-id=257 bgcolor=#E9E9E9
| 550257 ||  || — || February 3, 2012 || Haleakala || Pan-STARRS ||  || align=right | 1.5 km || 
|-id=258 bgcolor=#E9E9E9
| 550258 ||  || — || February 15, 2012 || Haleakala || Pan-STARRS ||  || align=right | 1.6 km || 
|-id=259 bgcolor=#fefefe
| 550259 ||  || — || December 26, 2014 || Haleakala || Pan-STARRS ||  || align=right data-sort-value="0.59" | 590 m || 
|-id=260 bgcolor=#d6d6d6
| 550260 ||  || — || May 3, 2008 || Mount Lemmon || Mount Lemmon Survey ||  || align=right | 2.8 km || 
|-id=261 bgcolor=#E9E9E9
| 550261 ||  || — || February 14, 2012 || Haleakala || Pan-STARRS ||  || align=right | 1.6 km || 
|-id=262 bgcolor=#E9E9E9
| 550262 ||  || — || March 5, 2017 || Haleakala || Pan-STARRS ||  || align=right | 2.0 km || 
|-id=263 bgcolor=#E9E9E9
| 550263 ||  || — || February 3, 2012 || Haleakala || Pan-STARRS ||  || align=right | 1.8 km || 
|-id=264 bgcolor=#E9E9E9
| 550264 ||  || — || August 30, 2005 || Kitt Peak || Spacewatch ||  || align=right | 2.2 km || 
|-id=265 bgcolor=#E9E9E9
| 550265 ||  || — || September 29, 2005 || Kitt Peak || Spacewatch ||  || align=right | 1.5 km || 
|-id=266 bgcolor=#E9E9E9
| 550266 ||  || — || December 1, 2010 || Mount Lemmon || Mount Lemmon Survey ||  || align=right | 1.5 km || 
|-id=267 bgcolor=#E9E9E9
| 550267 ||  || — || August 16, 2009 || Kitt Peak || Spacewatch ||  || align=right | 2.4 km || 
|-id=268 bgcolor=#E9E9E9
| 550268 ||  || — || February 16, 2012 || Haleakala || Pan-STARRS ||  || align=right | 1.8 km || 
|-id=269 bgcolor=#E9E9E9
| 550269 ||  || — || March 8, 2003 || Anderson Mesa || LONEOS ||  || align=right | 2.9 km || 
|-id=270 bgcolor=#E9E9E9
| 550270 ||  || — || March 10, 2003 || Kitt Peak || Spacewatch ||  || align=right | 1.8 km || 
|-id=271 bgcolor=#FFC2E0
| 550271 ||  || — || February 20, 2012 || Haleakala || Pan-STARRS || AMO || align=right data-sort-value="0.39" | 390 m || 
|-id=272 bgcolor=#E9E9E9
| 550272 ||  || — || September 14, 2005 || Kitt Peak || Spacewatch ||  || align=right | 1.9 km || 
|-id=273 bgcolor=#E9E9E9
| 550273 ||  || — || November 2, 2011 || Mount Lemmon || Mount Lemmon Survey ||  || align=right | 2.3 km || 
|-id=274 bgcolor=#E9E9E9
| 550274 ||  || — || January 3, 2012 || Kitt Peak || Spacewatch ||  || align=right | 1.5 km || 
|-id=275 bgcolor=#E9E9E9
| 550275 ||  || — || November 5, 2010 || Mount Lemmon || Mount Lemmon Survey ||  || align=right | 1.8 km || 
|-id=276 bgcolor=#E9E9E9
| 550276 ||  || — || January 17, 2007 || Catalina || CSS ||  || align=right | 2.3 km || 
|-id=277 bgcolor=#E9E9E9
| 550277 ||  || — || February 22, 2012 || Kitt Peak || Spacewatch ||  || align=right | 2.1 km || 
|-id=278 bgcolor=#E9E9E9
| 550278 ||  || — || October 31, 2010 || Mount Lemmon || Mount Lemmon Survey ||  || align=right | 1.3 km || 
|-id=279 bgcolor=#E9E9E9
| 550279 ||  || — || August 27, 2005 || Palomar || NEAT ||  || align=right | 2.1 km || 
|-id=280 bgcolor=#E9E9E9
| 550280 ||  || — || January 10, 2007 || Kitt Peak || Spacewatch ||  || align=right | 2.1 km || 
|-id=281 bgcolor=#E9E9E9
| 550281 ||  || — || May 5, 2008 || Catalina || CSS ||  || align=right | 2.1 km || 
|-id=282 bgcolor=#E9E9E9
| 550282 ||  || — || April 1, 2003 || Apache Point || SDSS Collaboration ||  || align=right | 1.9 km || 
|-id=283 bgcolor=#d6d6d6
| 550283 ||  || — || December 30, 2011 || Kitt Peak || Spacewatch ||  || align=right | 2.7 km || 
|-id=284 bgcolor=#E9E9E9
| 550284 ||  || — || August 7, 2004 || Palomar || NEAT ||  || align=right | 1.7 km || 
|-id=285 bgcolor=#E9E9E9
| 550285 ||  || — || October 1, 2005 || Mount Lemmon || Mount Lemmon Survey ||  || align=right | 1.9 km || 
|-id=286 bgcolor=#E9E9E9
| 550286 ||  || — || February 9, 2007 || Kitt Peak || Spacewatch ||  || align=right | 2.8 km || 
|-id=287 bgcolor=#E9E9E9
| 550287 ||  || — || August 31, 2005 || Palomar || NEAT ||  || align=right | 1.9 km || 
|-id=288 bgcolor=#E9E9E9
| 550288 ||  || — || February 25, 2003 || Campo Imperatore || CINEOS ||  || align=right | 2.1 km || 
|-id=289 bgcolor=#E9E9E9
| 550289 ||  || — || December 28, 2011 || Mount Lemmon || Mount Lemmon Survey ||  || align=right | 2.4 km || 
|-id=290 bgcolor=#E9E9E9
| 550290 ||  || — || October 15, 2001 || Palomar || NEAT ||  || align=right | 2.1 km || 
|-id=291 bgcolor=#E9E9E9
| 550291 ||  || — || February 23, 2012 || Mount Lemmon || Mount Lemmon Survey ||  || align=right | 1.9 km || 
|-id=292 bgcolor=#E9E9E9
| 550292 ||  || — || February 26, 2012 || Mount Lemmon || Mount Lemmon Survey ||  || align=right | 2.1 km || 
|-id=293 bgcolor=#fefefe
| 550293 ||  || — || February 24, 2012 || Haleakala || Pan-STARRS ||  || align=right data-sort-value="0.71" | 710 m || 
|-id=294 bgcolor=#E9E9E9
| 550294 ||  || — || February 1, 2012 || Kitt Peak || Spacewatch ||  || align=right | 1.8 km || 
|-id=295 bgcolor=#E9E9E9
| 550295 ||  || — || January 18, 2012 || Kitt Peak || Spacewatch ||  || align=right | 1.4 km || 
|-id=296 bgcolor=#E9E9E9
| 550296 ||  || — || April 1, 2008 || Mount Lemmon || Mount Lemmon Survey ||  || align=right | 1.6 km || 
|-id=297 bgcolor=#fefefe
| 550297 ||  || — || February 9, 2005 || Anderson Mesa || LONEOS ||  || align=right data-sort-value="0.71" | 710 m || 
|-id=298 bgcolor=#fefefe
| 550298 ||  || — || April 16, 2005 || Vail-Jarnac || Jarnac Obs. ||  || align=right data-sort-value="0.78" | 780 m || 
|-id=299 bgcolor=#E9E9E9
| 550299 ||  || — || September 19, 2010 || Kitt Peak || Spacewatch ||  || align=right | 2.0 km || 
|-id=300 bgcolor=#E9E9E9
| 550300 ||  || — || January 19, 2012 || Haleakala || Pan-STARRS ||  || align=right | 1.8 km || 
|}

550301–550400 

|-bgcolor=#E9E9E9
| 550301 ||  || — || January 27, 2003 || Palomar || NEAT ||  || align=right | 2.2 km || 
|-id=302 bgcolor=#E9E9E9
| 550302 ||  || — || August 25, 2000 || Cerro Tololo || R. Millis, L. H. Wasserman ||  || align=right | 2.3 km || 
|-id=303 bgcolor=#E9E9E9
| 550303 ||  || — || October 11, 2010 || Mount Lemmon || Mount Lemmon Survey ||  || align=right | 1.3 km || 
|-id=304 bgcolor=#E9E9E9
| 550304 ||  || — || March 29, 2008 || Kitt Peak || Spacewatch ||  || align=right | 1.8 km || 
|-id=305 bgcolor=#d6d6d6
| 550305 ||  || — || November 1, 2005 || Kitt Peak || Spacewatch || Tj (2.98) || align=right | 4.2 km || 
|-id=306 bgcolor=#E9E9E9
| 550306 ||  || — || April 16, 2004 || Kitt Peak || Spacewatch ||  || align=right | 1.2 km || 
|-id=307 bgcolor=#E9E9E9
| 550307 ||  || — || January 29, 2003 || Palomar || NEAT ||  || align=right | 1.6 km || 
|-id=308 bgcolor=#E9E9E9
| 550308 ||  || — || October 23, 2001 || Palomar || NEAT ||  || align=right | 2.9 km || 
|-id=309 bgcolor=#E9E9E9
| 550309 ||  || — || January 30, 2003 || Palomar || NEAT ||  || align=right | 1.5 km || 
|-id=310 bgcolor=#C7FF8F
| 550310 ||  || — || January 19, 2012 || Haleakala || Pan-STARRS || centaur || align=right | 55 km || 
|-id=311 bgcolor=#E9E9E9
| 550311 ||  || — || March 24, 2003 || Haleakala || AMOS ||  || align=right | 2.7 km || 
|-id=312 bgcolor=#fefefe
| 550312 ||  || — || January 18, 2012 || Kitt Peak || Spacewatch ||  || align=right data-sort-value="0.62" | 620 m || 
|-id=313 bgcolor=#E9E9E9
| 550313 ||  || — || February 13, 2012 || Kitt Peak || Spacewatch ||  || align=right | 2.0 km || 
|-id=314 bgcolor=#E9E9E9
| 550314 ||  || — || February 24, 2012 || Haleakala || Pan-STARRS ||  || align=right data-sort-value="0.94" | 940 m || 
|-id=315 bgcolor=#E9E9E9
| 550315 ||  || — || February 24, 2012 || Haleakala || Pan-STARRS ||  || align=right | 2.5 km || 
|-id=316 bgcolor=#E9E9E9
| 550316 ||  || — || December 25, 2011 || Mount Lemmon || Mount Lemmon Survey ||  || align=right | 2.7 km || 
|-id=317 bgcolor=#E9E9E9
| 550317 ||  || — || December 21, 2006 || Kitt Peak || L. H. Wasserman || GEF || align=right | 1.6 km || 
|-id=318 bgcolor=#E9E9E9
| 550318 ||  || — || August 6, 2005 || Palomar || NEAT ||  || align=right | 1.5 km || 
|-id=319 bgcolor=#E9E9E9
| 550319 ||  || — || April 4, 2008 || Mount Lemmon || Mount Lemmon Survey ||  || align=right | 1.7 km || 
|-id=320 bgcolor=#E9E9E9
| 550320 ||  || — || February 15, 2012 || Haleakala || Pan-STARRS ||  || align=right | 1.9 km || 
|-id=321 bgcolor=#E9E9E9
| 550321 ||  || — || August 6, 2005 || Palomar || NEAT ||  || align=right | 2.4 km || 
|-id=322 bgcolor=#E9E9E9
| 550322 ||  || — || February 23, 2012 || Mount Lemmon || Mount Lemmon Survey ||  || align=right | 2.0 km || 
|-id=323 bgcolor=#E9E9E9
| 550323 ||  || — || August 26, 2005 || Palomar || NEAT ||  || align=right | 2.8 km || 
|-id=324 bgcolor=#E9E9E9
| 550324 ||  || — || March 14, 2012 || Haleakala || Pan-STARRS || HNS || align=right | 1.4 km || 
|-id=325 bgcolor=#E9E9E9
| 550325 ||  || — || February 21, 2012 || Kitt Peak || Spacewatch ||  || align=right | 2.4 km || 
|-id=326 bgcolor=#E9E9E9
| 550326 ||  || — || August 31, 2005 || Kitt Peak || Spacewatch ||  || align=right | 2.4 km || 
|-id=327 bgcolor=#E9E9E9
| 550327 ||  || — || November 12, 2010 || Mount Lemmon || Mount Lemmon Survey ||  || align=right | 2.0 km || 
|-id=328 bgcolor=#E9E9E9
| 550328 ||  || — || April 6, 2008 || Kitt Peak || Spacewatch ||  || align=right | 1.2 km || 
|-id=329 bgcolor=#E9E9E9
| 550329 ||  || — || February 23, 2012 || Mount Lemmon || Mount Lemmon Survey ||  || align=right | 1.8 km || 
|-id=330 bgcolor=#E9E9E9
| 550330 ||  || — || February 27, 2012 || Kitt Peak || Spacewatch ||  || align=right | 1.4 km || 
|-id=331 bgcolor=#E9E9E9
| 550331 ||  || — || October 26, 2005 || Kitt Peak || Spacewatch ||  || align=right | 2.1 km || 
|-id=332 bgcolor=#E9E9E9
| 550332 ||  || — || January 29, 2007 || Kitt Peak || Spacewatch ||  || align=right | 2.1 km || 
|-id=333 bgcolor=#E9E9E9
| 550333 ||  || — || February 29, 2012 || Oukaimeden || M. Ory ||  || align=right | 1.9 km || 
|-id=334 bgcolor=#E9E9E9
| 550334 ||  || — || February 20, 2012 || Haleakala || Pan-STARRS ||  || align=right | 2.2 km || 
|-id=335 bgcolor=#E9E9E9
| 550335 ||  || — || February 28, 2012 || Haleakala || Pan-STARRS ||  || align=right | 1.9 km || 
|-id=336 bgcolor=#fefefe
| 550336 ||  || — || February 27, 2012 || Kitt Peak || Spacewatch ||  || align=right data-sort-value="0.65" | 650 m || 
|-id=337 bgcolor=#fefefe
| 550337 ||  || — || February 16, 2012 || Haleakala || Pan-STARRS ||  || align=right data-sort-value="0.57" | 570 m || 
|-id=338 bgcolor=#E9E9E9
| 550338 ||  || — || February 20, 2012 || Haleakala || Pan-STARRS ||  || align=right | 1.9 km || 
|-id=339 bgcolor=#E9E9E9
| 550339 ||  || — || February 18, 2012 || Catalina || CSS ||  || align=right | 1.7 km || 
|-id=340 bgcolor=#E9E9E9
| 550340 ||  || — || October 28, 2006 || Mount Lemmon || Mount Lemmon Survey ||  || align=right | 2.5 km || 
|-id=341 bgcolor=#E9E9E9
| 550341 ||  || — || February 27, 2012 || Haleakala || Pan-STARRS ||  || align=right | 1.5 km || 
|-id=342 bgcolor=#E9E9E9
| 550342 ||  || — || January 19, 2012 || Mount Lemmon || Mount Lemmon Survey ||  || align=right | 2.1 km || 
|-id=343 bgcolor=#E9E9E9
| 550343 ||  || — || February 27, 2012 || Haleakala || Pan-STARRS ||  || align=right | 1.9 km || 
|-id=344 bgcolor=#E9E9E9
| 550344 ||  || — || February 20, 2012 || Haleakala || Pan-STARRS ||  || align=right | 1.9 km || 
|-id=345 bgcolor=#E9E9E9
| 550345 ||  || — || January 10, 2007 || Kitt Peak || Spacewatch ||  || align=right | 2.0 km || 
|-id=346 bgcolor=#E9E9E9
| 550346 ||  || — || March 13, 2012 || Mount Lemmon || Mount Lemmon Survey ||  || align=right | 1.3 km || 
|-id=347 bgcolor=#E9E9E9
| 550347 ||  || — || February 26, 2012 || Haleakala || Pan-STARRS ||  || align=right data-sort-value="0.86" | 860 m || 
|-id=348 bgcolor=#E9E9E9
| 550348 ||  || — || January 19, 2012 || Haleakala || Pan-STARRS ||  || align=right | 1.1 km || 
|-id=349 bgcolor=#E9E9E9
| 550349 ||  || — || March 22, 2012 || Catalina || CSS ||  || align=right | 2.1 km || 
|-id=350 bgcolor=#fefefe
| 550350 ||  || — || March 14, 2012 || Haleakala || Pan-STARRS || H || align=right data-sort-value="0.64" | 640 m || 
|-id=351 bgcolor=#E9E9E9
| 550351 ||  || — || May 8, 2013 || Haleakala || Pan-STARRS ||  || align=right | 1.0 km || 
|-id=352 bgcolor=#E9E9E9
| 550352 ||  || — || April 24, 2003 || Kitt Peak || Spacewatch ||  || align=right | 2.0 km || 
|-id=353 bgcolor=#E9E9E9
| 550353 ||  || — || January 28, 2016 || Mount Lemmon || Mount Lemmon Survey ||  || align=right | 2.2 km || 
|-id=354 bgcolor=#E9E9E9
| 550354 ||  || — || March 15, 2012 || Mount Lemmon || Mount Lemmon Survey ||  || align=right | 2.1 km || 
|-id=355 bgcolor=#E9E9E9
| 550355 ||  || — || March 15, 2012 || Mount Lemmon || Mount Lemmon Survey ||  || align=right | 1.8 km || 
|-id=356 bgcolor=#E9E9E9
| 550356 ||  || — || March 15, 2012 || Mount Lemmon || Mount Lemmon Survey ||  || align=right | 1.3 km || 
|-id=357 bgcolor=#E9E9E9
| 550357 ||  || — || March 14, 2012 || Catalina || CSS ||  || align=right | 2.1 km || 
|-id=358 bgcolor=#E9E9E9
| 550358 ||  || — || March 15, 2012 || Mount Lemmon || Mount Lemmon Survey ||  || align=right | 1.0 km || 
|-id=359 bgcolor=#E9E9E9
| 550359 ||  || — || December 27, 2011 || Mount Lemmon || Mount Lemmon Survey ||  || align=right | 2.8 km || 
|-id=360 bgcolor=#E9E9E9
| 550360 ||  || — || January 10, 2007 || Mount Lemmon || Mount Lemmon Survey ||  || align=right | 1.8 km || 
|-id=361 bgcolor=#E9E9E9
| 550361 ||  || — || February 29, 2012 || Catalina || CSS ||  || align=right | 2.6 km || 
|-id=362 bgcolor=#fefefe
| 550362 ||  || — || April 16, 2005 || Kitt Peak || Spacewatch || MAS || align=right data-sort-value="0.65" | 650 m || 
|-id=363 bgcolor=#E9E9E9
| 550363 ||  || — || March 31, 2003 || Apache Point || SDSS Collaboration ||  || align=right | 3.0 km || 
|-id=364 bgcolor=#E9E9E9
| 550364 ||  || — || March 18, 2012 || Piszkesteto || K. Sárneczky ||  || align=right | 1.6 km || 
|-id=365 bgcolor=#E9E9E9
| 550365 ||  || — || April 27, 2008 || Kitt Peak || Spacewatch ||  || align=right | 2.1 km || 
|-id=366 bgcolor=#E9E9E9
| 550366 ||  || — || March 17, 2012 || Mount Lemmon || Mount Lemmon Survey ||  || align=right | 1.9 km || 
|-id=367 bgcolor=#E9E9E9
| 550367 ||  || — || February 21, 2012 || Kitt Peak || Spacewatch ||  || align=right | 1.9 km || 
|-id=368 bgcolor=#E9E9E9
| 550368 ||  || — || February 25, 2012 || Kitt Peak || Spacewatch ||  || align=right | 2.5 km || 
|-id=369 bgcolor=#E9E9E9
| 550369 ||  || — || October 7, 2010 || Kitt Peak || Spacewatch ||  || align=right | 1.8 km || 
|-id=370 bgcolor=#E9E9E9
| 550370 ||  || — || March 26, 2003 || Kitt Peak || Spacewatch || WIT || align=right | 1.4 km || 
|-id=371 bgcolor=#fefefe
| 550371 ||  || — || April 16, 2005 || Kitt Peak || Spacewatch ||  || align=right data-sort-value="0.78" | 780 m || 
|-id=372 bgcolor=#E9E9E9
| 550372 ||  || — || November 9, 2009 || Mount Lemmon || Mount Lemmon Survey ||  || align=right | 2.0 km || 
|-id=373 bgcolor=#E9E9E9
| 550373 ||  || — || March 10, 2003 || Anderson Mesa || LONEOS || ADE || align=right | 1.9 km || 
|-id=374 bgcolor=#E9E9E9
| 550374 ||  || — || March 16, 2012 || Mount Lemmon || Mount Lemmon Survey ||  || align=right | 1.7 km || 
|-id=375 bgcolor=#fefefe
| 550375 ||  || — || March 13, 2012 || Mount Lemmon || Mount Lemmon Survey ||  || align=right data-sort-value="0.66" | 660 m || 
|-id=376 bgcolor=#fefefe
| 550376 ||  || — || October 10, 2004 || Kitt Peak || L. H. Wasserman, J. R. Lovering ||  || align=right data-sort-value="0.59" | 590 m || 
|-id=377 bgcolor=#E9E9E9
| 550377 ||  || — || February 24, 2012 || Kitt Peak || Spacewatch ||  || align=right | 1.4 km || 
|-id=378 bgcolor=#E9E9E9
| 550378 ||  || — || March 24, 2012 || Mount Lemmon || Mount Lemmon Survey ||  || align=right | 2.0 km || 
|-id=379 bgcolor=#E9E9E9
| 550379 ||  || — || March 12, 2012 || Kitt Peak || Spacewatch ||  || align=right | 1.3 km || 
|-id=380 bgcolor=#E9E9E9
| 550380 ||  || — || March 22, 2012 || Catalina || CSS ||  || align=right | 2.7 km || 
|-id=381 bgcolor=#E9E9E9
| 550381 ||  || — || February 27, 2012 || Haleakala || Pan-STARRS ||  || align=right | 1.3 km || 
|-id=382 bgcolor=#E9E9E9
| 550382 ||  || — || November 28, 2011 || Mount Lemmon || Mount Lemmon Survey ||  || align=right | 2.3 km || 
|-id=383 bgcolor=#E9E9E9
| 550383 ||  || — || September 15, 2009 || Kitt Peak || Spacewatch ||  || align=right | 2.8 km || 
|-id=384 bgcolor=#E9E9E9
| 550384 ||  || — || March 28, 2012 || Kitt Peak || Spacewatch ||  || align=right | 2.1 km || 
|-id=385 bgcolor=#d6d6d6
| 550385 ||  || — || November 1, 2000 || Kitt Peak || Spacewatch ||  || align=right | 3.4 km || 
|-id=386 bgcolor=#fefefe
| 550386 ||  || — || May 10, 2005 || Kitt Peak || Spacewatch || ERI || align=right | 1.6 km || 
|-id=387 bgcolor=#E9E9E9
| 550387 ||  || — || March 24, 2012 || Kitt Peak || Spacewatch ||  || align=right | 2.4 km || 
|-id=388 bgcolor=#E9E9E9
| 550388 ||  || — || March 10, 2003 || Anderson Mesa || LONEOS ||  || align=right | 2.9 km || 
|-id=389 bgcolor=#fefefe
| 550389 ||  || — || January 2, 2011 || Mayhill-ISON || L. Elenin || V || align=right data-sort-value="0.92" | 920 m || 
|-id=390 bgcolor=#fefefe
| 550390 ||  || — || April 12, 2005 || Mount Lemmon || Mount Lemmon Survey ||  || align=right data-sort-value="0.62" | 620 m || 
|-id=391 bgcolor=#E9E9E9
| 550391 ||  || — || February 23, 2007 || Mount Lemmon || Mount Lemmon Survey ||  || align=right | 2.2 km || 
|-id=392 bgcolor=#d6d6d6
| 550392 ||  || — || January 28, 2006 || Catalina || CSS ||  || align=right | 4.4 km || 
|-id=393 bgcolor=#E9E9E9
| 550393 ||  || — || March 21, 2012 || Catalina || CSS ||  || align=right | 1.7 km || 
|-id=394 bgcolor=#E9E9E9
| 550394 ||  || — || March 24, 2012 || Kitt Peak || Spacewatch ||  || align=right | 1.9 km || 
|-id=395 bgcolor=#E9E9E9
| 550395 ||  || — || March 29, 2012 || Kitt Peak || Spacewatch ||  || align=right | 2.4 km || 
|-id=396 bgcolor=#d6d6d6
| 550396 ||  || — || March 28, 2012 || Haleakala || Pan-STARRS ||  || align=right | 2.5 km || 
|-id=397 bgcolor=#E9E9E9
| 550397 ||  || — || March 5, 2008 || Kitt Peak || Spacewatch ||  || align=right | 1.1 km || 
|-id=398 bgcolor=#d6d6d6
| 550398 ||  || — || December 4, 2015 || Haleakala || Pan-STARRS ||  || align=right | 2.9 km || 
|-id=399 bgcolor=#E9E9E9
| 550399 ||  || — || April 1, 2017 || Haleakala || Pan-STARRS ||  || align=right | 2.1 km || 
|-id=400 bgcolor=#E9E9E9
| 550400 ||  || — || March 23, 2012 || Mount Lemmon || Mount Lemmon Survey ||  || align=right | 1.8 km || 
|}

550401–550500 

|-bgcolor=#d6d6d6
| 550401 ||  || — || March 29, 2012 || Haleakala || Pan-STARRS ||  || align=right | 2.2 km || 
|-id=402 bgcolor=#fefefe
| 550402 ||  || — || March 14, 2012 || Haleakala || Pan-STARRS || H || align=right data-sort-value="0.44" | 440 m || 
|-id=403 bgcolor=#E9E9E9
| 550403 ||  || — || April 1, 2012 || Catalina || CSS ||  || align=right | 1.8 km || 
|-id=404 bgcolor=#E9E9E9
| 550404 ||  || — || April 29, 2003 || Kitt Peak || Spacewatch ||  || align=right | 1.9 km || 
|-id=405 bgcolor=#E9E9E9
| 550405 ||  || — || March 5, 2012 || Kitt Peak || Spacewatch ||  || align=right | 2.3 km || 
|-id=406 bgcolor=#E9E9E9
| 550406 ||  || — || April 13, 2012 || Haleakala || Pan-STARRS ||  || align=right | 1.8 km || 
|-id=407 bgcolor=#E9E9E9
| 550407 ||  || — || January 4, 2011 || Mount Lemmon || Mount Lemmon Survey ||  || align=right | 1.8 km || 
|-id=408 bgcolor=#E9E9E9
| 550408 ||  || — || November 17, 2006 || Kitt Peak || Spacewatch ||  || align=right | 2.2 km || 
|-id=409 bgcolor=#E9E9E9
| 550409 ||  || — || February 14, 2007 || Lulin || LUSS ||  || align=right | 2.7 km || 
|-id=410 bgcolor=#E9E9E9
| 550410 ||  || — || March 11, 2007 || Mount Lemmon || Mount Lemmon Survey ||  || align=right | 1.8 km || 
|-id=411 bgcolor=#E9E9E9
| 550411 ||  || — || April 13, 2012 || Haleakala || Pan-STARRS ||  || align=right | 1.8 km || 
|-id=412 bgcolor=#fefefe
| 550412 ||  || — || August 22, 2009 || Hibiscus || N. Teamo || NYS || align=right data-sort-value="0.55" | 550 m || 
|-id=413 bgcolor=#E9E9E9
| 550413 ||  || — || March 27, 2003 || Palomar || NEAT ||  || align=right | 1.4 km || 
|-id=414 bgcolor=#E9E9E9
| 550414 ||  || — || November 1, 1999 || Kitt Peak || Spacewatch ||  || align=right | 2.8 km || 
|-id=415 bgcolor=#E9E9E9
| 550415 ||  || — || April 12, 2012 || Haleakala || Pan-STARRS ||  || align=right | 2.2 km || 
|-id=416 bgcolor=#E9E9E9
| 550416 ||  || — || November 3, 2005 || Kitt Peak || Spacewatch ||  || align=right | 2.2 km || 
|-id=417 bgcolor=#E9E9E9
| 550417 ||  || — || October 24, 2005 || Kitt Peak || Spacewatch || GEF || align=right | 1.1 km || 
|-id=418 bgcolor=#E9E9E9
| 550418 ||  || — || March 9, 2007 || Mount Lemmon || Mount Lemmon Survey ||  || align=right | 1.9 km || 
|-id=419 bgcolor=#E9E9E9
| 550419 ||  || — || July 29, 2008 || Crni Vrh || J. Zakrajšek ||  || align=right | 2.8 km || 
|-id=420 bgcolor=#E9E9E9
| 550420 ||  || — || April 15, 2012 || Haleakala || Pan-STARRS ||  || align=right | 2.7 km || 
|-id=421 bgcolor=#E9E9E9
| 550421 ||  || — || April 15, 2012 || Haleakala || Pan-STARRS ||  || align=right | 2.1 km || 
|-id=422 bgcolor=#E9E9E9
| 550422 ||  || — || August 9, 2013 || Catalina || CSS ||  || align=right | 2.3 km || 
|-id=423 bgcolor=#fefefe
| 550423 ||  || — || October 31, 2005 || Palomar || NEAT || H || align=right data-sort-value="0.73" | 730 m || 
|-id=424 bgcolor=#E9E9E9
| 550424 ||  || — || March 27, 2012 || Catalina || CSS ||  || align=right | 1.8 km || 
|-id=425 bgcolor=#E9E9E9
| 550425 ||  || — || April 15, 2012 || Haleakala || Pan-STARRS ||  || align=right | 2.7 km || 
|-id=426 bgcolor=#fefefe
| 550426 ||  || — || December 20, 2007 || Kitt Peak || Spacewatch ||  || align=right data-sort-value="0.64" | 640 m || 
|-id=427 bgcolor=#E9E9E9
| 550427 ||  || — || February 8, 2007 || Mount Lemmon || Mount Lemmon Survey ||  || align=right | 2.2 km || 
|-id=428 bgcolor=#FA8072
| 550428 ||  || — || June 6, 2002 || Palomar || NEAT ||  || align=right data-sort-value="0.66" | 660 m || 
|-id=429 bgcolor=#E9E9E9
| 550429 ||  || — || April 15, 2012 || Haleakala || Pan-STARRS ||  || align=right | 2.2 km || 
|-id=430 bgcolor=#E9E9E9
| 550430 ||  || — || December 6, 2010 || Mount Lemmon || Mount Lemmon Survey ||  || align=right | 2.2 km || 
|-id=431 bgcolor=#E9E9E9
| 550431 ||  || — || April 15, 2012 || Haleakala || Pan-STARRS ||  || align=right | 1.3 km || 
|-id=432 bgcolor=#E9E9E9
| 550432 ||  || — || April 24, 2012 || Mount Lemmon || Mount Lemmon Survey ||  || align=right | 2.0 km || 
|-id=433 bgcolor=#fefefe
| 550433 ||  || — || March 4, 2001 || Kitt Peak || Spacewatch ||  || align=right data-sort-value="0.72" | 720 m || 
|-id=434 bgcolor=#E9E9E9
| 550434 ||  || — || March 24, 2012 || Mount Lemmon || Mount Lemmon Survey ||  || align=right | 2.7 km || 
|-id=435 bgcolor=#E9E9E9
| 550435 ||  || — || March 29, 2012 || Kitt Peak || Spacewatch ||  || align=right | 2.2 km || 
|-id=436 bgcolor=#d6d6d6
| 550436 ||  || — || April 22, 2012 || Kitt Peak || Spacewatch ||  || align=right | 1.9 km || 
|-id=437 bgcolor=#E9E9E9
| 550437 ||  || — || March 15, 2007 || Kitt Peak || Spacewatch ||  || align=right | 2.2 km || 
|-id=438 bgcolor=#E9E9E9
| 550438 ||  || — || March 29, 2012 || Siding Spring || SSS ||  || align=right | 1.5 km || 
|-id=439 bgcolor=#E9E9E9
| 550439 ||  || — || May 28, 2008 || Mount Lemmon || Mount Lemmon Survey ||  || align=right | 2.5 km || 
|-id=440 bgcolor=#E9E9E9
| 550440 ||  || — || February 22, 2007 || Catalina || CSS ||  || align=right | 2.7 km || 
|-id=441 bgcolor=#E9E9E9
| 550441 ||  || — || April 15, 2012 || Haleakala || Pan-STARRS ||  || align=right | 2.8 km || 
|-id=442 bgcolor=#fefefe
| 550442 ||  || — || April 27, 2012 || Haleakala || Pan-STARRS ||  || align=right | 1.0 km || 
|-id=443 bgcolor=#E9E9E9
| 550443 ||  || — || April 15, 2012 || Haleakala || Pan-STARRS ||  || align=right | 2.5 km || 
|-id=444 bgcolor=#E9E9E9
| 550444 ||  || — || January 29, 2011 || Mount Lemmon || Mount Lemmon Survey ||  || align=right | 1.9 km || 
|-id=445 bgcolor=#E9E9E9
| 550445 ||  || — || November 17, 2009 || Kitt Peak || Spacewatch ||  || align=right | 2.4 km || 
|-id=446 bgcolor=#d6d6d6
| 550446 ||  || — || April 19, 2012 || Mount Lemmon || Mount Lemmon Survey ||  || align=right | 1.8 km || 
|-id=447 bgcolor=#E9E9E9
| 550447 ||  || — || April 19, 2012 || Mount Lemmon || Mount Lemmon Survey ||  || align=right | 1.7 km || 
|-id=448 bgcolor=#E9E9E9
| 550448 ||  || — || April 20, 2012 || Mount Lemmon || Mount Lemmon Survey ||  || align=right | 2.2 km || 
|-id=449 bgcolor=#d6d6d6
| 550449 ||  || — || April 12, 2002 || Palomar || NEAT ||  || align=right | 3.9 km || 
|-id=450 bgcolor=#E9E9E9
| 550450 ||  || — || April 28, 2003 || Kitt Peak || Spacewatch ||  || align=right | 2.0 km || 
|-id=451 bgcolor=#d6d6d6
| 550451 ||  || — || April 19, 2012 || Mount Lemmon || Mount Lemmon Survey ||  || align=right | 1.8 km || 
|-id=452 bgcolor=#E9E9E9
| 550452 ||  || — || September 20, 2009 || Kitt Peak || Spacewatch ||  || align=right | 1.9 km || 
|-id=453 bgcolor=#E9E9E9
| 550453 ||  || — || April 21, 2012 || Kitt Peak || Spacewatch ||  || align=right | 1.4 km || 
|-id=454 bgcolor=#fefefe
| 550454 ||  || — || April 27, 2012 || Haleakala || Pan-STARRS ||  || align=right data-sort-value="0.62" | 620 m || 
|-id=455 bgcolor=#E9E9E9
| 550455 ||  || — || April 19, 2012 || Mount Lemmon || Mount Lemmon Survey ||  || align=right | 1.7 km || 
|-id=456 bgcolor=#E9E9E9
| 550456 ||  || — || April 18, 2012 || Mount Lemmon || Mount Lemmon Survey ||  || align=right | 1.2 km || 
|-id=457 bgcolor=#fefefe
| 550457 ||  || — || April 21, 2012 || Mayhill-ISON || L. Elenin ||  || align=right data-sort-value="0.77" | 770 m || 
|-id=458 bgcolor=#d6d6d6
| 550458 ||  || — || April 30, 2012 || Kitt Peak || Spacewatch ||  || align=right | 2.1 km || 
|-id=459 bgcolor=#E9E9E9
| 550459 ||  || — || April 15, 2012 || Haleakala || Pan-STARRS ||  || align=right | 2.8 km || 
|-id=460 bgcolor=#E9E9E9
| 550460 ||  || — || December 13, 2010 || Mount Lemmon || Mount Lemmon Survey ||  || align=right | 2.3 km || 
|-id=461 bgcolor=#E9E9E9
| 550461 ||  || — || March 12, 2002 || Kitt Peak || Spacewatch ||  || align=right | 1.9 km || 
|-id=462 bgcolor=#E9E9E9
| 550462 ||  || — || January 12, 2002 || Palomar || NEAT ||  || align=right | 3.1 km || 
|-id=463 bgcolor=#E9E9E9
| 550463 ||  || — || August 21, 2008 || Kitt Peak || Spacewatch ||  || align=right | 2.6 km || 
|-id=464 bgcolor=#E9E9E9
| 550464 ||  || — || May 12, 2012 || Haleakala || Pan-STARRS ||  || align=right | 1.8 km || 
|-id=465 bgcolor=#fefefe
| 550465 ||  || — || February 13, 2008 || Mount Lemmon || Mount Lemmon Survey ||  || align=right data-sort-value="0.80" | 800 m || 
|-id=466 bgcolor=#E9E9E9
| 550466 ||  || — || March 15, 2012 || Mount Lemmon || Mount Lemmon Survey ||  || align=right | 2.0 km || 
|-id=467 bgcolor=#fefefe
| 550467 ||  || — || April 20, 2012 || Mount Lemmon || Mount Lemmon Survey || H || align=right data-sort-value="0.54" | 540 m || 
|-id=468 bgcolor=#E9E9E9
| 550468 ||  || — || January 2, 2011 || Mount Lemmon || Mount Lemmon Survey ||  || align=right | 1.8 km || 
|-id=469 bgcolor=#fefefe
| 550469 ||  || — || April 13, 2008 || Mount Lemmon || Mount Lemmon Survey ||  || align=right data-sort-value="0.82" | 820 m || 
|-id=470 bgcolor=#E9E9E9
| 550470 ||  || — || October 18, 2009 || Mount Lemmon || Mount Lemmon Survey ||  || align=right | 2.1 km || 
|-id=471 bgcolor=#E9E9E9
| 550471 ||  || — || March 19, 2007 || Mount Lemmon || Mount Lemmon Survey ||  || align=right | 2.4 km || 
|-id=472 bgcolor=#d6d6d6
| 550472 ||  || — || May 15, 2012 || Mount Lemmon || Mount Lemmon Survey ||  || align=right | 2.4 km || 
|-id=473 bgcolor=#fefefe
| 550473 ||  || — || September 11, 2005 || Kitt Peak || Spacewatch ||  || align=right data-sort-value="0.71" | 710 m || 
|-id=474 bgcolor=#d6d6d6
| 550474 ||  || — || March 14, 2007 || Mount Lemmon || Mount Lemmon Survey ||  || align=right | 2.7 km || 
|-id=475 bgcolor=#fefefe
| 550475 ||  || — || July 29, 2000 || Anderson Mesa || LONEOS ||  || align=right data-sort-value="0.80" | 800 m || 
|-id=476 bgcolor=#E9E9E9
| 550476 ||  || — || October 7, 2004 || Palomar || NEAT || GEF || align=right | 1.4 km || 
|-id=477 bgcolor=#E9E9E9
| 550477 ||  || — || May 1, 2012 || Mount Lemmon || Mount Lemmon Survey ||  || align=right | 1.8 km || 
|-id=478 bgcolor=#E9E9E9
| 550478 ||  || — || March 28, 2012 || Kitt Peak || Spacewatch ||  || align=right | 2.7 km || 
|-id=479 bgcolor=#E9E9E9
| 550479 ||  || — || March 9, 2002 || Kitt Peak || Spacewatch ||  || align=right | 2.1 km || 
|-id=480 bgcolor=#E9E9E9
| 550480 ||  || — || May 14, 2012 || Mount Lemmon || Mount Lemmon Survey ||  || align=right | 2.1 km || 
|-id=481 bgcolor=#E9E9E9
| 550481 ||  || — || November 10, 2009 || Kitt Peak || Spacewatch ||  || align=right | 2.4 km || 
|-id=482 bgcolor=#d6d6d6
| 550482 ||  || — || April 19, 2007 || Mount Lemmon || Mount Lemmon Survey ||  || align=right | 2.9 km || 
|-id=483 bgcolor=#fefefe
| 550483 ||  || — || May 12, 2012 || Haleakala || Pan-STARRS ||  || align=right data-sort-value="0.78" | 780 m || 
|-id=484 bgcolor=#fefefe
| 550484 ||  || — || April 15, 2004 || Apache Point || SDSS Collaboration || H || align=right data-sort-value="0.83" | 830 m || 
|-id=485 bgcolor=#E9E9E9
| 550485 ||  || — || December 30, 2005 || Kitt Peak || Spacewatch ||  || align=right | 2.3 km || 
|-id=486 bgcolor=#fefefe
| 550486 ||  || — || February 25, 2003 || Haleakala || AMOS ||  || align=right data-sort-value="0.94" | 940 m || 
|-id=487 bgcolor=#E9E9E9
| 550487 ||  || — || April 27, 2012 || Mount Lemmon || Mount Lemmon Survey ||  || align=right | 1.8 km || 
|-id=488 bgcolor=#fefefe
| 550488 ||  || — || August 21, 2002 || Palomar || NEAT || H || align=right data-sort-value="0.82" | 820 m || 
|-id=489 bgcolor=#d6d6d6
| 550489 ||  || — || May 16, 2012 || Mount Lemmon || Mount Lemmon Survey ||  || align=right | 2.0 km || 
|-id=490 bgcolor=#fefefe
| 550490 ||  || — || September 18, 2003 || Haleakala || AMOS ||  || align=right data-sort-value="0.86" | 860 m || 
|-id=491 bgcolor=#E9E9E9
| 550491 ||  || — || February 8, 2011 || Mount Lemmon || Mount Lemmon Survey ||  || align=right | 2.0 km || 
|-id=492 bgcolor=#E9E9E9
| 550492 ||  || — || December 28, 2005 || Kitt Peak || Spacewatch ||  || align=right | 2.4 km || 
|-id=493 bgcolor=#E9E9E9
| 550493 ||  || — || May 16, 2012 || Mount Lemmon || Mount Lemmon Survey ||  || align=right data-sort-value="0.83" | 830 m || 
|-id=494 bgcolor=#fefefe
| 550494 ||  || — || February 26, 2008 || Mount Lemmon || Mount Lemmon Survey || MAS || align=right data-sort-value="0.59" | 590 m || 
|-id=495 bgcolor=#E9E9E9
| 550495 ||  || — || September 11, 2004 || Kitt Peak || Spacewatch ||  || align=right | 2.1 km || 
|-id=496 bgcolor=#E9E9E9
| 550496 ||  || — || February 7, 2011 || Mount Lemmon || Mount Lemmon Survey ||  || align=right | 2.0 km || 
|-id=497 bgcolor=#fefefe
| 550497 ||  || — || April 27, 2012 || Haleakala || Pan-STARRS ||  || align=right data-sort-value="0.71" | 710 m || 
|-id=498 bgcolor=#d6d6d6
| 550498 ||  || — || April 21, 2012 || Mount Lemmon || Mount Lemmon Survey ||  || align=right | 2.2 km || 
|-id=499 bgcolor=#d6d6d6
| 550499 ||  || — || January 7, 2006 || Mount Lemmon || Mount Lemmon Survey ||  || align=right | 2.2 km || 
|-id=500 bgcolor=#d6d6d6
| 550500 ||  || — || January 18, 2005 || Kitt Peak || Spacewatch ||  || align=right | 4.4 km || 
|}

550501–550600 

|-bgcolor=#d6d6d6
| 550501 ||  || — || September 9, 2013 || Haleakala || Pan-STARRS ||  || align=right | 2.1 km || 
|-id=502 bgcolor=#d6d6d6
| 550502 ||  || — || May 18, 2012 || Haleakala || Pan-STARRS ||  || align=right | 2.4 km || 
|-id=503 bgcolor=#fefefe
| 550503 ||  || — || June 9, 2012 || Haleakala || Pan-STARRS || H || align=right data-sort-value="0.68" | 680 m || 
|-id=504 bgcolor=#E9E9E9
| 550504 ||  || — || September 7, 2008 || Mount Lemmon || Mount Lemmon Survey ||  || align=right | 1.9 km || 
|-id=505 bgcolor=#fefefe
| 550505 ||  || — || March 11, 2008 || Siding Spring || SSS ||  || align=right | 1.4 km || 
|-id=506 bgcolor=#d6d6d6
| 550506 ||  || — || May 16, 2012 || Kitt Peak || Spacewatch ||  || align=right | 4.2 km || 
|-id=507 bgcolor=#d6d6d6
| 550507 ||  || — || October 24, 2009 || Kitt Peak || Spacewatch ||  || align=right | 2.4 km || 
|-id=508 bgcolor=#fefefe
| 550508 ||  || — || September 1, 2005 || Palomar || NEAT ||  || align=right data-sort-value="0.98" | 980 m || 
|-id=509 bgcolor=#E9E9E9
| 550509 ||  || — || March 16, 2007 || Mount Lemmon || Mount Lemmon Survey ||  || align=right | 1.4 km || 
|-id=510 bgcolor=#d6d6d6
| 550510 ||  || — || May 13, 2012 || Mount Lemmon || Mount Lemmon Survey ||  || align=right | 2.8 km || 
|-id=511 bgcolor=#d6d6d6
| 550511 ||  || — || October 29, 2003 || Socorro || LINEAR ||  || align=right | 3.1 km || 
|-id=512 bgcolor=#d6d6d6
| 550512 ||  || — || February 10, 2016 || Haleakala || Pan-STARRS ||  || align=right | 3.4 km || 
|-id=513 bgcolor=#d6d6d6
| 550513 ||  || — || September 21, 2003 || Kitt Peak || Spacewatch ||  || align=right | 2.7 km || 
|-id=514 bgcolor=#d6d6d6
| 550514 ||  || — || March 11, 2011 || Mount Lemmon || Mount Lemmon Survey ||  || align=right | 3.2 km || 
|-id=515 bgcolor=#d6d6d6
| 550515 ||  || — || October 17, 2003 || Kitt Peak || Spacewatch ||  || align=right | 2.9 km || 
|-id=516 bgcolor=#fefefe
| 550516 ||  || — || December 11, 2006 || Kitt Peak || Spacewatch ||  || align=right data-sort-value="0.90" | 900 m || 
|-id=517 bgcolor=#d6d6d6
| 550517 ||  || — || June 16, 2012 || Haleakala || Pan-STARRS ||  || align=right | 3.7 km || 
|-id=518 bgcolor=#d6d6d6
| 550518 ||  || — || October 25, 2003 || Kitt Peak || Spacewatch ||  || align=right | 2.9 km || 
|-id=519 bgcolor=#d6d6d6
| 550519 ||  || — || November 21, 2008 || Kitt Peak || Spacewatch ||  || align=right | 3.4 km || 
|-id=520 bgcolor=#d6d6d6
| 550520 ||  || — || December 29, 2003 || Kitt Peak || Spacewatch ||  || align=right | 4.0 km || 
|-id=521 bgcolor=#d6d6d6
| 550521 ||  || — || June 19, 2012 || Mount Lemmon || Mount Lemmon Survey ||  || align=right | 2.9 km || 
|-id=522 bgcolor=#d6d6d6
| 550522 ||  || — || December 8, 2013 || Mount Lemmon || Mount Lemmon Survey ||  || align=right | 2.9 km || 
|-id=523 bgcolor=#d6d6d6
| 550523 ||  || — || June 14, 2007 || Kitt Peak || Spacewatch ||  || align=right | 2.9 km || 
|-id=524 bgcolor=#d6d6d6
| 550524 ||  || — || June 17, 2012 || Kitt Peak || Spacewatch ||  || align=right | 3.1 km || 
|-id=525 bgcolor=#d6d6d6
| 550525 Sigourneyweaver ||  ||  || July 12, 2012 || Zelenchukskaya Stn || T. V. Kryachko, B. Satovski || Tj (2.96) || align=right | 3.2 km || 
|-id=526 bgcolor=#FA8072
| 550526 ||  || — || July 16, 2012 || Castelmartini || E. Prosperi, S. Prosperi || H || align=right data-sort-value="0.57" | 570 m || 
|-id=527 bgcolor=#d6d6d6
| 550527 ||  || — || October 5, 2007 || Kitt Peak || Spacewatch ||  || align=right | 3.9 km || 
|-id=528 bgcolor=#d6d6d6
| 550528 ||  || — || September 21, 2007 || XuYi || PMO NEO ||  || align=right | 3.4 km || 
|-id=529 bgcolor=#d6d6d6
| 550529 ||  || — || July 21, 2012 || Siding Spring || SSS ||  || align=right | 2.8 km || 
|-id=530 bgcolor=#E9E9E9
| 550530 ||  || — || July 19, 2012 || Siding Spring || SSS ||  || align=right | 1.4 km || 
|-id=531 bgcolor=#fefefe
| 550531 ||  || — || August 27, 2005 || Palomar || NEAT ||  || align=right data-sort-value="0.94" | 940 m || 
|-id=532 bgcolor=#fefefe
| 550532 ||  || — || November 17, 2009 || Kitt Peak || Spacewatch ||  || align=right data-sort-value="0.68" | 680 m || 
|-id=533 bgcolor=#d6d6d6
| 550533 ||  || — || August 8, 2012 || Haleakala || Pan-STARRS ||  || align=right | 3.2 km || 
|-id=534 bgcolor=#d6d6d6
| 550534 ||  || — || July 28, 2012 || Haleakala || Pan-STARRS ||  || align=right | 3.6 km || 
|-id=535 bgcolor=#d6d6d6
| 550535 ||  || — || August 8, 2012 || Haleakala || Pan-STARRS || Tj (2.99) || align=right | 3.9 km || 
|-id=536 bgcolor=#d6d6d6
| 550536 ||  || — || April 28, 2011 || Haleakala || Pan-STARRS ||  || align=right | 3.1 km || 
|-id=537 bgcolor=#d6d6d6
| 550537 ||  || — || August 8, 2012 || Haleakala || Pan-STARRS ||  || align=right | 3.1 km || 
|-id=538 bgcolor=#fefefe
| 550538 ||  || — || September 14, 2004 || Socorro || LINEAR || H || align=right data-sort-value="0.93" | 930 m || 
|-id=539 bgcolor=#fefefe
| 550539 ||  || — || August 10, 2012 || Kitt Peak || Spacewatch ||  || align=right data-sort-value="0.68" | 680 m || 
|-id=540 bgcolor=#fefefe
| 550540 ||  || — || August 16, 2002 || Palomar || NEAT ||  || align=right data-sort-value="0.71" | 710 m || 
|-id=541 bgcolor=#fefefe
| 550541 ||  || — || January 13, 2010 || Kitt Peak || Spacewatch ||  || align=right | 1.2 km || 
|-id=542 bgcolor=#d6d6d6
| 550542 ||  || — || December 2, 2008 || Kitt Peak || Spacewatch ||  || align=right | 3.7 km || 
|-id=543 bgcolor=#d6d6d6
| 550543 ||  || — || December 4, 2007 || Catalina || CSS ||  || align=right | 3.5 km || 
|-id=544 bgcolor=#d6d6d6
| 550544 ||  || — || August 5, 2007 || Great Shefford || P. Birtwhistle ||  || align=right | 2.4 km || 
|-id=545 bgcolor=#d6d6d6
| 550545 ||  || — || August 13, 2012 || Haleakala || Pan-STARRS ||  || align=right | 3.1 km || 
|-id=546 bgcolor=#d6d6d6
| 550546 ||  || — || August 12, 2012 || Siding Spring || SSS ||  || align=right | 3.1 km || 
|-id=547 bgcolor=#d6d6d6
| 550547 ||  || — || August 13, 2012 || Haleakala || Pan-STARRS ||  || align=right | 2.7 km || 
|-id=548 bgcolor=#d6d6d6
| 550548 ||  || — || September 9, 2007 || Kitt Peak || Spacewatch ||  || align=right | 2.5 km || 
|-id=549 bgcolor=#d6d6d6
| 550549 ||  || — || March 11, 2011 || Mount Lemmon || Mount Lemmon Survey ||  || align=right | 3.4 km || 
|-id=550 bgcolor=#fefefe
| 550550 ||  || — || July 18, 2012 || Catalina || CSS ||  || align=right data-sort-value="0.94" | 940 m || 
|-id=551 bgcolor=#d6d6d6
| 550551 ||  || — || September 18, 2007 || Kitt Peak || Spacewatch ||  || align=right | 2.8 km || 
|-id=552 bgcolor=#fefefe
| 550552 ||  || — || January 25, 2011 || Mount Lemmon || Mount Lemmon Survey || H || align=right data-sort-value="0.45" | 450 m || 
|-id=553 bgcolor=#fefefe
| 550553 ||  || — || August 11, 2012 || Siding Spring || SSS ||  || align=right data-sort-value="0.68" | 680 m || 
|-id=554 bgcolor=#d6d6d6
| 550554 ||  || — || August 24, 2001 || Kitt Peak || Spacewatch ||  || align=right | 2.9 km || 
|-id=555 bgcolor=#d6d6d6
| 550555 ||  || — || August 6, 2012 || Haleakala || Pan-STARRS ||  || align=right | 3.4 km || 
|-id=556 bgcolor=#d6d6d6
| 550556 ||  || — || June 23, 1995 || Kitt Peak || Spacewatch ||  || align=right | 3.5 km || 
|-id=557 bgcolor=#d6d6d6
| 550557 ||  || — || November 20, 2008 || Kitt Peak || Spacewatch ||  || align=right | 3.7 km || 
|-id=558 bgcolor=#E9E9E9
| 550558 ||  || — || August 13, 2012 || Haleakala || Pan-STARRS ||  || align=right data-sort-value="0.83" | 830 m || 
|-id=559 bgcolor=#d6d6d6
| 550559 ||  || — || August 6, 2012 || Haleakala || Pan-STARRS ||  || align=right | 2.9 km || 
|-id=560 bgcolor=#d6d6d6
| 550560 ||  || — || February 17, 2004 || Kitt Peak || Spacewatch ||  || align=right | 3.4 km || 
|-id=561 bgcolor=#fefefe
| 550561 ||  || — || August 13, 2012 || Haleakala || Pan-STARRS ||  || align=right data-sort-value="0.75" | 750 m || 
|-id=562 bgcolor=#d6d6d6
| 550562 ||  || — || August 10, 2012 || Kitt Peak || Spacewatch ||  || align=right | 2.9 km || 
|-id=563 bgcolor=#d6d6d6
| 550563 ||  || — || March 21, 2004 || Kitt Peak || Spacewatch ||  || align=right | 3.1 km || 
|-id=564 bgcolor=#C2E0FF
| 550564 ||  || — || August 17, 2011 || Haleakala || Pan-STARRS || other TNOcritical || align=right | 172 km || 
|-id=565 bgcolor=#E9E9E9
| 550565 ||  || — || July 15, 2016 || Mount Lemmon || Mount Lemmon Survey ||  || align=right data-sort-value="0.78" | 780 m || 
|-id=566 bgcolor=#fefefe
| 550566 ||  || — || February 24, 2014 || Haleakala || Pan-STARRS ||  || align=right | 1.0 km || 
|-id=567 bgcolor=#fefefe
| 550567 ||  || — || August 12, 2012 || Siding Spring || SSS ||  || align=right data-sort-value="0.78" | 780 m || 
|-id=568 bgcolor=#d6d6d6
| 550568 ||  || — || August 9, 2012 || Les Engarouines || L. Bernasconi ||  || align=right | 3.4 km || 
|-id=569 bgcolor=#d6d6d6
| 550569 ||  || — || January 16, 2015 || Haleakala || Pan-STARRS ||  || align=right | 3.2 km || 
|-id=570 bgcolor=#d6d6d6
| 550570 ||  || — || August 13, 2012 || Haleakala || Pan-STARRS ||  || align=right | 2.4 km || 
|-id=571 bgcolor=#d6d6d6
| 550571 ||  || — || August 13, 2012 || Haleakala || Pan-STARRS ||  || align=right | 2.1 km || 
|-id=572 bgcolor=#d6d6d6
| 550572 ||  || — || February 22, 2004 || Kitt Peak || Spacewatch ||  || align=right | 3.2 km || 
|-id=573 bgcolor=#fefefe
| 550573 ||  || — || September 16, 2009 || Mount Lemmon || Mount Lemmon Survey ||  || align=right data-sort-value="0.75" | 750 m || 
|-id=574 bgcolor=#fefefe
| 550574 ||  || — || January 19, 2007 || Mauna Kea || Q. s. observers || (2076) || align=right data-sort-value="0.65" | 650 m || 
|-id=575 bgcolor=#d6d6d6
| 550575 ||  || — || October 11, 2007 || Catalina || CSS ||  || align=right | 3.5 km || 
|-id=576 bgcolor=#d6d6d6
| 550576 ||  || — || August 17, 2012 || Haleakala || Pan-STARRS ||  || align=right | 2.8 km || 
|-id=577 bgcolor=#d6d6d6
| 550577 ||  || — || August 14, 2012 || Siding Spring || SSS ||  || align=right | 3.7 km || 
|-id=578 bgcolor=#d6d6d6
| 550578 ||  || — || December 18, 2009 || Mount Lemmon || Mount Lemmon Survey ||  || align=right | 3.9 km || 
|-id=579 bgcolor=#d6d6d6
| 550579 ||  || — || May 9, 2011 || Mount Lemmon || Mount Lemmon Survey ||  || align=right | 2.8 km || 
|-id=580 bgcolor=#E9E9E9
| 550580 ||  || — || May 23, 2012 || Mount Lemmon || Mount Lemmon Survey ||  || align=right | 1.2 km || 
|-id=581 bgcolor=#E9E9E9
| 550581 ||  || — || August 26, 2012 || La Sagra || OAM Obs. ||  || align=right | 3.6 km || 
|-id=582 bgcolor=#fefefe
| 550582 ||  || — || February 12, 2004 || Kitt Peak || Spacewatch ||  || align=right data-sort-value="0.75" | 750 m || 
|-id=583 bgcolor=#d6d6d6
| 550583 ||  || — || December 29, 2008 || Kitt Peak || Spacewatch ||  || align=right | 3.5 km || 
|-id=584 bgcolor=#d6d6d6
| 550584 ||  || — || August 17, 2012 || Les Engarouines || L. Bernasconi ||  || align=right | 3.1 km || 
|-id=585 bgcolor=#d6d6d6
| 550585 ||  || — || August 24, 2012 || Kitt Peak || Spacewatch ||  || align=right | 2.7 km || 
|-id=586 bgcolor=#d6d6d6
| 550586 ||  || — || January 18, 2009 || Kitt Peak || Spacewatch || HYG || align=right | 2.7 km || 
|-id=587 bgcolor=#fefefe
| 550587 ||  || — || February 16, 2005 || La Silla || A. Boattini ||  || align=right data-sort-value="0.66" | 660 m || 
|-id=588 bgcolor=#E9E9E9
| 550588 ||  || — || December 1, 2005 || Kitt Peak || L. H. Wasserman, R. Millis ||  || align=right data-sort-value="0.82" | 820 m || 
|-id=589 bgcolor=#d6d6d6
| 550589 ||  || — || February 12, 2004 || Kitt Peak || Spacewatch ||  || align=right | 3.5 km || 
|-id=590 bgcolor=#d6d6d6
| 550590 ||  || — || August 25, 2012 || Kitt Peak || Spacewatch ||  || align=right | 2.7 km || 
|-id=591 bgcolor=#d6d6d6
| 550591 ||  || — || August 25, 2012 || Kitt Peak || Spacewatch ||  || align=right | 3.1 km || 
|-id=592 bgcolor=#d6d6d6
| 550592 ||  || — || August 14, 2012 || Kitt Peak || Spacewatch ||  || align=right | 2.8 km || 
|-id=593 bgcolor=#d6d6d6
| 550593 ||  || — || February 3, 2009 || Kitt Peak || Spacewatch ||  || align=right | 2.5 km || 
|-id=594 bgcolor=#d6d6d6
| 550594 ||  || — || August 25, 2012 || Kitt Peak || Spacewatch || 7:4 || align=right | 3.5 km || 
|-id=595 bgcolor=#d6d6d6
| 550595 ||  || — || November 3, 2007 || Kitt Peak || Spacewatch ||  || align=right | 2.4 km || 
|-id=596 bgcolor=#fefefe
| 550596 ||  || — || August 5, 2005 || Palomar || NEAT ||  || align=right data-sort-value="0.86" | 860 m || 
|-id=597 bgcolor=#fefefe
| 550597 ||  || — || July 19, 2012 || Siding Spring || SSS ||  || align=right data-sort-value="0.82" | 820 m || 
|-id=598 bgcolor=#fefefe
| 550598 ||  || — || August 6, 2005 || Palomar || NEAT ||  || align=right data-sort-value="0.90" | 900 m || 
|-id=599 bgcolor=#fefefe
| 550599 ||  || — || August 17, 2001 || Palomar || NEAT ||  || align=right data-sort-value="0.90" | 900 m || 
|-id=600 bgcolor=#C2FFFF
| 550600 ||  || — || August 16, 2012 || Haleakala || Pan-STARRS || L5 || align=right | 6.6 km || 
|}

550601–550700 

|-bgcolor=#d6d6d6
| 550601 ||  || — || August 16, 2012 || ESA OGS || ESA OGS ||  || align=right | 2.8 km || 
|-id=602 bgcolor=#d6d6d6
| 550602 ||  || — || September 3, 2007 || Catalina || CSS ||  || align=right | 3.5 km || 
|-id=603 bgcolor=#d6d6d6
| 550603 ||  || — || August 17, 2012 || Haleakala || Pan-STARRS ||  || align=right | 3.9 km || 
|-id=604 bgcolor=#d6d6d6
| 550604 ||  || — || July 28, 2012 || Haleakala || Pan-STARRS ||  || align=right | 3.7 km || 
|-id=605 bgcolor=#E9E9E9
| 550605 ||  || — || July 29, 2008 || Kitt Peak || Spacewatch ||  || align=right data-sort-value="0.85" | 850 m || 
|-id=606 bgcolor=#d6d6d6
| 550606 ||  || — || August 24, 2012 || Kitt Peak || Spacewatch ||  || align=right | 3.5 km || 
|-id=607 bgcolor=#d6d6d6
| 550607 ||  || — || March 13, 2005 || Kitt Peak || Spacewatch ||  || align=right | 3.1 km || 
|-id=608 bgcolor=#fefefe
| 550608 ||  || — || August 16, 2012 || ESA OGS || ESA OGS ||  || align=right data-sort-value="0.94" | 940 m || 
|-id=609 bgcolor=#fefefe
| 550609 ||  || — || November 17, 2009 || Mount Lemmon || Mount Lemmon Survey ||  || align=right data-sort-value="0.75" | 750 m || 
|-id=610 bgcolor=#d6d6d6
| 550610 ||  || — || March 5, 2016 || Haleakala || Pan-STARRS ||  || align=right | 3.1 km || 
|-id=611 bgcolor=#d6d6d6
| 550611 ||  || — || August 26, 2012 || Haleakala || Pan-STARRS ||  || align=right | 2.9 km || 
|-id=612 bgcolor=#fefefe
| 550612 ||  || — || November 22, 2005 || Palomar || NEAT ||  || align=right | 1.0 km || 
|-id=613 bgcolor=#d6d6d6
| 550613 ||  || — || September 11, 2012 || Crni Vrh || J. Zakrajšek || Tj (2.94) || align=right | 3.2 km || 
|-id=614 bgcolor=#fefefe
| 550614 ||  || — || August 29, 2002 || Palomar || NEAT ||  || align=right data-sort-value="0.68" | 680 m || 
|-id=615 bgcolor=#fefefe
| 550615 ||  || — || August 27, 2009 || Kitt Peak || Spacewatch ||  || align=right | 1.2 km || 
|-id=616 bgcolor=#fefefe
| 550616 ||  || — || October 30, 2002 || Haleakala || AMOS ||  || align=right data-sort-value="0.82" | 820 m || 
|-id=617 bgcolor=#FA8072
| 550617 ||  || — || September 14, 2012 || Mount Lemmon || Mount Lemmon Survey || H || align=right data-sort-value="0.71" | 710 m || 
|-id=618 bgcolor=#d6d6d6
| 550618 ||  || — || September 13, 2007 || Mount Lemmon || Mount Lemmon Survey ||  || align=right | 3.4 km || 
|-id=619 bgcolor=#fefefe
| 550619 ||  || — || August 24, 2008 || Crni Vrh || J. Skvarč ||  || align=right | 1.4 km || 
|-id=620 bgcolor=#d6d6d6
| 550620 ||  || — || February 22, 2004 || Kitt Peak || M. W. Buie ||  || align=right | 3.5 km || 
|-id=621 bgcolor=#d6d6d6
| 550621 ||  || — || September 14, 2012 || Catalina || CSS ||  || align=right | 3.7 km || 
|-id=622 bgcolor=#d6d6d6
| 550622 ||  || — || April 10, 2005 || Kitt Peak || Kitt Peak Obs. ||  || align=right | 4.2 km || 
|-id=623 bgcolor=#d6d6d6
| 550623 ||  || — || September 15, 2012 || Catalina || CSS ||  || align=right | 3.2 km || 
|-id=624 bgcolor=#fefefe
| 550624 ||  || — || July 29, 2005 || Palomar || NEAT ||  || align=right data-sort-value="0.82" | 820 m || 
|-id=625 bgcolor=#fefefe
| 550625 ||  || — || July 30, 2005 || Palomar || NEAT || (2076) || align=right data-sort-value="0.78" | 780 m || 
|-id=626 bgcolor=#fefefe
| 550626 ||  || — || February 24, 2006 || Palomar || NEAT || H || align=right data-sort-value="0.75" | 750 m || 
|-id=627 bgcolor=#d6d6d6
| 550627 ||  || — || August 23, 2012 || Les Engarouines || L. Bernasconi ||  || align=right | 4.4 km || 
|-id=628 bgcolor=#fefefe
| 550628 ||  || — || September 25, 2005 || Kitt Peak || Spacewatch ||  || align=right data-sort-value="0.78" | 780 m || 
|-id=629 bgcolor=#FA8072
| 550629 ||  || — || May 21, 2001 || Cerro Tololo || J. L. Elliot, L. H. Wasserman || H || align=right data-sort-value="0.78" | 780 m || 
|-id=630 bgcolor=#E9E9E9
| 550630 ||  || — || September 16, 2004 || Kitt Peak || Spacewatch ||  || align=right | 1.1 km || 
|-id=631 bgcolor=#fefefe
| 550631 ||  || — || August 30, 2005 || Palomar || NEAT ||  || align=right data-sort-value="0.75" | 750 m || 
|-id=632 bgcolor=#d6d6d6
| 550632 ||  || — || January 20, 2009 || Mount Lemmon || Mount Lemmon Survey ||  || align=right | 3.7 km || 
|-id=633 bgcolor=#fefefe
| 550633 ||  || — || August 25, 2012 || Haleakala || Pan-STARRS ||  || align=right data-sort-value="0.71" | 710 m || 
|-id=634 bgcolor=#FA8072
| 550634 ||  || — || August 8, 2012 || Haleakala || Pan-STARRS || H || align=right data-sort-value="0.52" | 520 m || 
|-id=635 bgcolor=#d6d6d6
| 550635 ||  || — || October 17, 2001 || Palomar || NEAT ||  || align=right | 2.9 km || 
|-id=636 bgcolor=#fefefe
| 550636 ||  || — || May 1, 2008 || Kitt Peak || Spacewatch ||  || align=right data-sort-value="0.71" | 710 m || 
|-id=637 bgcolor=#d6d6d6
| 550637 ||  || — || September 17, 2001 || Desert Eagle || W. K. Y. Yeung ||  || align=right | 3.7 km || 
|-id=638 bgcolor=#FA8072
| 550638 ||  || — || July 6, 2005 || Siding Spring || SSS ||  || align=right data-sort-value="0.98" | 980 m || 
|-id=639 bgcolor=#fefefe
| 550639 ||  || — || August 14, 2012 || Haleakala || Pan-STARRS ||  || align=right data-sort-value="0.98" | 980 m || 
|-id=640 bgcolor=#fefefe
| 550640 ||  || — || June 4, 2011 || Lulin || LUSS || V || align=right data-sort-value="0.59" | 590 m || 
|-id=641 bgcolor=#fefefe
| 550641 ||  || — || July 15, 2002 || Palomar || NEAT ||  || align=right data-sort-value="0.82" | 820 m || 
|-id=642 bgcolor=#d6d6d6
| 550642 ||  || — || September 15, 2012 || ESA OGS || ESA OGS ||  || align=right | 2.2 km || 
|-id=643 bgcolor=#d6d6d6
| 550643 ||  || — || September 15, 2012 || Kitt Peak || Spacewatch ||  || align=right | 2.9 km || 
|-id=644 bgcolor=#E9E9E9
| 550644 ||  || — || February 27, 2007 || Kitt Peak || Spacewatch ||  || align=right data-sort-value="0.94" | 940 m || 
|-id=645 bgcolor=#d6d6d6
| 550645 ||  || — || April 7, 2005 || Kitt Peak || Spacewatch ||  || align=right | 2.9 km || 
|-id=646 bgcolor=#E9E9E9
| 550646 ||  || — || November 3, 2004 || Palomar || NEAT ||  || align=right data-sort-value="0.94" | 940 m || 
|-id=647 bgcolor=#d6d6d6
| 550647 ||  || — || October 9, 2007 || Mount Lemmon || Mount Lemmon Survey ||  || align=right | 2.3 km || 
|-id=648 bgcolor=#d6d6d6
| 550648 ||  || — || August 25, 2012 || Kitt Peak || Spacewatch ||  || align=right | 2.4 km || 
|-id=649 bgcolor=#fefefe
| 550649 ||  || — || December 27, 2006 || Mount Lemmon || Mount Lemmon Survey ||  || align=right data-sort-value="0.71" | 710 m || 
|-id=650 bgcolor=#d6d6d6
| 550650 ||  || — || January 1, 2009 || Mount Lemmon || Mount Lemmon Survey ||  || align=right | 2.9 km || 
|-id=651 bgcolor=#fefefe
| 550651 ||  || — || September 29, 2005 || Kitt Peak || Spacewatch ||  || align=right data-sort-value="0.82" | 820 m || 
|-id=652 bgcolor=#fefefe
| 550652 ||  || — || July 29, 2005 || Palomar || NEAT ||  || align=right data-sort-value="0.90" | 900 m || 
|-id=653 bgcolor=#d6d6d6
| 550653 ||  || — || May 24, 2011 || Nogales || M. Schwartz, P. R. Holvorcem || EOS || align=right | 2.0 km || 
|-id=654 bgcolor=#E9E9E9
| 550654 ||  || — || September 21, 2012 || Kitt Peak || Spacewatch ||  || align=right data-sort-value="0.78" | 780 m || 
|-id=655 bgcolor=#E9E9E9
| 550655 ||  || — || March 2, 2011 || Mount Lemmon || Mount Lemmon Survey ||  || align=right data-sort-value="0.85" | 850 m || 
|-id=656 bgcolor=#fefefe
| 550656 ||  || — || August 26, 2012 || Haleakala || Pan-STARRS || V || align=right data-sort-value="0.62" | 620 m || 
|-id=657 bgcolor=#fefefe
| 550657 ||  || — || February 10, 2011 || Mount Lemmon || Mount Lemmon Survey ||  || align=right data-sort-value="0.59" | 590 m || 
|-id=658 bgcolor=#d6d6d6
| 550658 ||  || — || September 20, 2001 || Socorro || LINEAR ||  || align=right | 3.7 km || 
|-id=659 bgcolor=#E9E9E9
| 550659 ||  || — || September 18, 2012 || Mount Lemmon || Mount Lemmon Survey ||  || align=right data-sort-value="0.90" | 900 m || 
|-id=660 bgcolor=#d6d6d6
| 550660 ||  || — || August 14, 2006 || Siding Spring || SSS ||  || align=right | 4.6 km || 
|-id=661 bgcolor=#d6d6d6
| 550661 ||  || — || November 2, 2007 || Mount Lemmon || Mount Lemmon Survey ||  || align=right | 2.8 km || 
|-id=662 bgcolor=#fefefe
| 550662 ||  || — || September 18, 2012 || Mount Lemmon SkyCe || T. Vorobjov, A. Kostin ||  || align=right data-sort-value="0.78" | 780 m || 
|-id=663 bgcolor=#d6d6d6
| 550663 ||  || — || August 12, 2006 || Palomar || NEAT ||  || align=right | 3.7 km || 
|-id=664 bgcolor=#fefefe
| 550664 ||  || — || August 5, 2005 || Palomar || NEAT ||  || align=right data-sort-value="0.94" | 940 m || 
|-id=665 bgcolor=#d6d6d6
| 550665 ||  || — || September 19, 2012 || Mount Lemmon || Mount Lemmon Survey ||  || align=right | 3.1 km || 
|-id=666 bgcolor=#d6d6d6
| 550666 ||  || — || October 23, 2006 || Mauna Kea || Q. s. observers ||  || align=right | 2.8 km || 
|-id=667 bgcolor=#d6d6d6
| 550667 ||  || — || August 26, 2012 || Haleakala || Pan-STARRS ||  || align=right | 3.1 km || 
|-id=668 bgcolor=#fefefe
| 550668 ||  || — || June 5, 2002 || Palomar || NEAT ||  || align=right data-sort-value="0.78" | 780 m || 
|-id=669 bgcolor=#d6d6d6
| 550669 ||  || — || July 21, 2006 || Lulin || LUSS || EOS || align=right | 2.9 km || 
|-id=670 bgcolor=#E9E9E9
| 550670 ||  || — || September 26, 2012 || Nogales || M. Schwartz, P. R. Holvorcem || EUN || align=right | 1.6 km || 
|-id=671 bgcolor=#E9E9E9
| 550671 ||  || — || October 9, 2008 || Kitt Peak || Spacewatch ||  || align=right data-sort-value="0.82" | 820 m || 
|-id=672 bgcolor=#fefefe
| 550672 ||  || — || November 1, 2008 || Mount Lemmon || Mount Lemmon Survey ||  || align=right | 1.1 km || 
|-id=673 bgcolor=#d6d6d6
| 550673 ||  || — || February 11, 2004 || Kitt Peak || Spacewatch ||  || align=right | 3.4 km || 
|-id=674 bgcolor=#fefefe
| 550674 ||  || — || August 26, 1998 || Kitt Peak || Spacewatch ||  || align=right data-sort-value="0.78" | 780 m || 
|-id=675 bgcolor=#d6d6d6
| 550675 ||  || — || September 23, 2012 || Kitt Peak || Spacewatch ||  || align=right | 3.2 km || 
|-id=676 bgcolor=#fefefe
| 550676 ||  || — || August 24, 2012 || Kitt Peak || Spacewatch ||  || align=right data-sort-value="0.59" | 590 m || 
|-id=677 bgcolor=#d6d6d6
| 550677 ||  || — || September 16, 2012 || Mount Lemmon || Mount Lemmon Survey ||  || align=right | 2.9 km || 
|-id=678 bgcolor=#E9E9E9
| 550678 ||  || — || September 23, 2012 || Kitt Peak || Spacewatch ||  || align=right data-sort-value="0.82" | 820 m || 
|-id=679 bgcolor=#E9E9E9
| 550679 ||  || — || September 16, 2012 || ESA OGS || ESA OGS ||  || align=right data-sort-value="0.98" | 980 m || 
|-id=680 bgcolor=#d6d6d6
| 550680 ||  || — || September 24, 2012 || Mount Lemmon || Mount Lemmon Survey ||  || align=right | 2.9 km || 
|-id=681 bgcolor=#d6d6d6
| 550681 ||  || — || August 24, 2017 || Haleakala || Pan-STARRS ||  || align=right | 2.7 km || 
|-id=682 bgcolor=#E9E9E9
| 550682 ||  || — || September 24, 2012 || Kitt Peak || Spacewatch ||  || align=right data-sort-value="0.67" | 670 m || 
|-id=683 bgcolor=#fefefe
| 550683 ||  || — || September 16, 2012 || ESA OGS || ESA OGS ||  || align=right data-sort-value="0.94" | 940 m || 
|-id=684 bgcolor=#d6d6d6
| 550684 ||  || — || September 23, 2012 || Mount Lemmon || Mount Lemmon Survey ||  || align=right | 2.5 km || 
|-id=685 bgcolor=#fefefe
| 550685 ||  || — || September 20, 2012 || Mount Lemmon || Mount Lemmon Survey || H || align=right data-sort-value="0.65" | 650 m || 
|-id=686 bgcolor=#d6d6d6
| 550686 ||  || — || September 24, 2012 || Mount Lemmon || Mount Lemmon Survey ||  || align=right | 3.1 km || 
|-id=687 bgcolor=#fefefe
| 550687 ||  || — || October 25, 2005 || Mount Lemmon || Mount Lemmon Survey || NYS || align=right data-sort-value="0.76" | 760 m || 
|-id=688 bgcolor=#d6d6d6
| 550688 ||  || — || September 14, 2012 || Catalina || CSS ||  || align=right | 3.1 km || 
|-id=689 bgcolor=#fefefe
| 550689 ||  || — || July 30, 2005 || Palomar || NEAT ||  || align=right data-sort-value="0.94" | 940 m || 
|-id=690 bgcolor=#fefefe
| 550690 ||  || — || September 19, 2012 || Mount Lemmon || Mount Lemmon Survey || H || align=right data-sort-value="0.49" | 490 m || 
|-id=691 bgcolor=#fefefe
| 550691 ||  || — || August 13, 2001 || Haleakala || AMOS ||  || align=right | 1.1 km || 
|-id=692 bgcolor=#d6d6d6
| 550692 ||  || — || May 13, 2005 || Kitt Peak || Spacewatch || URS || align=right | 3.4 km || 
|-id=693 bgcolor=#fefefe
| 550693 ||  || — || October 5, 2012 || Haleakala || Pan-STARRS || H || align=right data-sort-value="0.86" | 860 m || 
|-id=694 bgcolor=#fefefe
| 550694 ||  || — || March 23, 2001 || Haleakala || AMOS ||  || align=right data-sort-value="0.88" | 880 m || 
|-id=695 bgcolor=#d6d6d6
| 550695 ||  || — || March 17, 2004 || Kitt Peak || Spacewatch || VER || align=right | 2.8 km || 
|-id=696 bgcolor=#E9E9E9
| 550696 ||  || — || October 10, 2008 || Mount Lemmon || Mount Lemmon Survey ||  || align=right | 1.2 km || 
|-id=697 bgcolor=#d6d6d6
| 550697 ||  || — || January 31, 2004 || Kitt Peak || Spacewatch || EOS || align=right | 2.6 km || 
|-id=698 bgcolor=#d6d6d6
| 550698 ||  || — || November 20, 2001 || Socorro || LINEAR || EOS || align=right | 2.2 km || 
|-id=699 bgcolor=#d6d6d6
| 550699 ||  || — || September 24, 2012 || Kitt Peak || Spacewatch ||  || align=right | 3.4 km || 
|-id=700 bgcolor=#d6d6d6
| 550700 ||  || — || August 17, 2006 || Palomar || NEAT ||  || align=right | 3.4 km || 
|}

550701–550800 

|-bgcolor=#d6d6d6
| 550701 ||  || — || March 16, 2004 || Kitt Peak || Spacewatch ||  || align=right | 2.9 km || 
|-id=702 bgcolor=#fefefe
| 550702 ||  || — || September 16, 2012 || Mount Lemmon || Mount Lemmon Survey ||  || align=right data-sort-value="0.57" | 570 m || 
|-id=703 bgcolor=#FA8072
| 550703 ||  || — || May 7, 2002 || Palomar || NEAT ||  || align=right data-sort-value="0.74" | 740 m || 
|-id=704 bgcolor=#fefefe
| 550704 ||  || — || September 18, 2012 || Kitt Peak || Spacewatch ||  || align=right data-sort-value="0.78" | 780 m || 
|-id=705 bgcolor=#fefefe
| 550705 ||  || — || December 4, 2005 || Kitt Peak || Spacewatch || MAS || align=right data-sort-value="0.75" | 750 m || 
|-id=706 bgcolor=#d6d6d6
| 550706 ||  || — || April 14, 2010 || Kitt Peak || Spacewatch ||  || align=right | 3.4 km || 
|-id=707 bgcolor=#E9E9E9
| 550707 ||  || — || September 14, 2012 || Kitt Peak || Spacewatch ||  || align=right data-sort-value="0.62" | 620 m || 
|-id=708 bgcolor=#d6d6d6
| 550708 ||  || — || April 14, 2010 || Mount Lemmon || Mount Lemmon Survey ||  || align=right | 3.7 km || 
|-id=709 bgcolor=#fefefe
| 550709 ||  || — || October 7, 2012 || Haleakala || Pan-STARRS || H || align=right data-sort-value="0.82" | 820 m || 
|-id=710 bgcolor=#E9E9E9
| 550710 ||  || — || September 22, 2012 || Kitt Peak || Spacewatch ||  || align=right data-sort-value="0.49" | 490 m || 
|-id=711 bgcolor=#d6d6d6
| 550711 ||  || — || September 26, 2006 || Kitt Peak || Spacewatch ||  || align=right | 3.7 km || 
|-id=712 bgcolor=#d6d6d6
| 550712 ||  || — || October 6, 2012 || Mount Lemmon || Mount Lemmon Survey ||  || align=right | 3.5 km || 
|-id=713 bgcolor=#fefefe
| 550713 ||  || — || October 4, 2002 || Palomar || NEAT ||  || align=right data-sort-value="0.98" | 980 m || 
|-id=714 bgcolor=#d6d6d6
| 550714 ||  || — || October 8, 2012 || Mount Lemmon || Mount Lemmon Survey ||  || align=right | 2.8 km || 
|-id=715 bgcolor=#fefefe
| 550715 ||  || — || February 25, 2007 || Kitt Peak || Spacewatch ||  || align=right data-sort-value="0.86" | 860 m || 
|-id=716 bgcolor=#d6d6d6
| 550716 ||  || — || August 26, 2012 || Haleakala || Pan-STARRS ||  || align=right | 3.2 km || 
|-id=717 bgcolor=#d6d6d6
| 550717 ||  || — || October 18, 2007 || Kitt Peak || Spacewatch ||  || align=right | 3.2 km || 
|-id=718 bgcolor=#d6d6d6
| 550718 ||  || — || September 16, 2012 || Mount Lemmon || Mount Lemmon Survey ||  || align=right | 2.8 km || 
|-id=719 bgcolor=#fefefe
| 550719 ||  || — || May 24, 2011 || Haleakala || Pan-STARRS || V || align=right data-sort-value="0.68" | 680 m || 
|-id=720 bgcolor=#d6d6d6
| 550720 ||  || — || October 8, 2012 || Mount Lemmon || Mount Lemmon Survey ||  || align=right | 2.5 km || 
|-id=721 bgcolor=#fefefe
| 550721 ||  || — || January 6, 2010 || Kitt Peak || Spacewatch ||  || align=right data-sort-value="0.75" | 750 m || 
|-id=722 bgcolor=#fefefe
| 550722 ||  || — || October 8, 2012 || Haleakala || Pan-STARRS ||  || align=right data-sort-value="0.68" | 680 m || 
|-id=723 bgcolor=#d6d6d6
| 550723 ||  || — || February 24, 2009 || Mount Lemmon || Mount Lemmon Survey ||  || align=right | 2.5 km || 
|-id=724 bgcolor=#E9E9E9
| 550724 ||  || — || October 8, 2012 || Mount Lemmon || Mount Lemmon Survey ||  || align=right data-sort-value="0.75" | 750 m || 
|-id=725 bgcolor=#d6d6d6
| 550725 ||  || — || November 20, 2007 || Kitt Peak || Spacewatch ||  || align=right | 3.7 km || 
|-id=726 bgcolor=#d6d6d6
| 550726 ||  || — || November 2, 2007 || Kitt Peak || Spacewatch ||  || align=right | 2.8 km || 
|-id=727 bgcolor=#fefefe
| 550727 ||  || — || February 12, 2004 || Kitt Peak || Spacewatch ||  || align=right data-sort-value="0.83" | 830 m || 
|-id=728 bgcolor=#d6d6d6
| 550728 ||  || — || October 27, 2005 || Kitt Peak || Spacewatch || 7:4 || align=right | 4.6 km || 
|-id=729 bgcolor=#d6d6d6
| 550729 ||  || — || November 13, 2001 || Uppsala-Kvistaberg || Kvistaberg Obs. ||  || align=right | 3.1 km || 
|-id=730 bgcolor=#fefefe
| 550730 ||  || — || October 9, 2012 || Mount Lemmon || Mount Lemmon Survey ||  || align=right data-sort-value="0.78" | 780 m || 
|-id=731 bgcolor=#fefefe
| 550731 ||  || — || July 6, 2005 || Siding Spring || SSS ||  || align=right data-sort-value="0.90" | 900 m || 
|-id=732 bgcolor=#d6d6d6
| 550732 ||  || — || May 10, 2005 || Cerro Tololo || M. W. Buie, L. H. Wasserman || (1298) || align=right | 3.1 km || 
|-id=733 bgcolor=#E9E9E9
| 550733 ||  || — || May 6, 2006 || Mount Lemmon || Mount Lemmon Survey || HNS || align=right | 1.3 km || 
|-id=734 bgcolor=#fefefe
| 550734 ||  || — || October 5, 2002 || Palomar || NEAT ||  || align=right data-sort-value="0.82" | 820 m || 
|-id=735 bgcolor=#d6d6d6
| 550735 ||  || — || October 6, 2012 || Mount Lemmon || Mount Lemmon Survey ||  || align=right | 2.4 km || 
|-id=736 bgcolor=#d6d6d6
| 550736 ||  || — || April 25, 2004 || Kitt Peak || Spacewatch ||  || align=right | 2.9 km || 
|-id=737 bgcolor=#d6d6d6
| 550737 ||  || — || November 12, 2001 || Apache Point || SDSS Collaboration ||  || align=right | 3.2 km || 
|-id=738 bgcolor=#E9E9E9
| 550738 ||  || — || October 6, 2012 || Mount Lemmon || Mount Lemmon Survey ||  || align=right | 1.3 km || 
|-id=739 bgcolor=#fefefe
| 550739 ||  || — || April 29, 2008 || Mount Lemmon || Mount Lemmon Survey ||  || align=right data-sort-value="0.59" | 590 m || 
|-id=740 bgcolor=#fefefe
| 550740 ||  || — || August 4, 2005 || Palomar || NEAT ||  || align=right data-sort-value="0.75" | 750 m || 
|-id=741 bgcolor=#d6d6d6
| 550741 ||  || — || October 7, 2012 || Haleakala || Pan-STARRS ||  || align=right | 2.5 km || 
|-id=742 bgcolor=#E9E9E9
| 550742 ||  || — || October 8, 2012 || Mayhill-ISON || L. Elenin ||  || align=right | 1.2 km || 
|-id=743 bgcolor=#fefefe
| 550743 ||  || — || September 16, 2012 || Kitt Peak || Spacewatch ||  || align=right data-sort-value="0.78" | 780 m || 
|-id=744 bgcolor=#E9E9E9
| 550744 ||  || — || May 8, 2011 || Mount Lemmon || Mount Lemmon Survey ||  || align=right data-sort-value="0.94" | 940 m || 
|-id=745 bgcolor=#fefefe
| 550745 ||  || — || August 20, 2008 || Kitt Peak || Spacewatch ||  || align=right data-sort-value="0.71" | 710 m || 
|-id=746 bgcolor=#E9E9E9
| 550746 ||  || — || September 16, 2012 || Kitt Peak || Spacewatch ||  || align=right data-sort-value="0.75" | 750 m || 
|-id=747 bgcolor=#fefefe
| 550747 ||  || — || October 8, 2012 || Kitt Peak || Spacewatch ||  || align=right data-sort-value="0.65" | 650 m || 
|-id=748 bgcolor=#E9E9E9
| 550748 ||  || — || September 17, 2012 || Crni Vrh || B. Mikuž || BRG || align=right | 1.5 km || 
|-id=749 bgcolor=#fefefe
| 550749 ||  || — || August 28, 2012 || Mount Lemmon || Mount Lemmon Survey ||  || align=right data-sort-value="0.78" | 780 m || 
|-id=750 bgcolor=#d6d6d6
| 550750 ||  || — || September 28, 2006 || Mount Lemmon || Mount Lemmon Survey ||  || align=right | 2.8 km || 
|-id=751 bgcolor=#fefefe
| 550751 ||  || — || October 24, 2005 || Kitt Peak || Spacewatch ||  || align=right data-sort-value="0.65" | 650 m || 
|-id=752 bgcolor=#fefefe
| 550752 ||  || — || October 2, 1995 || Kitt Peak || Spacewatch ||  || align=right data-sort-value="0.62" | 620 m || 
|-id=753 bgcolor=#E9E9E9
| 550753 ||  || — || October 9, 2012 || Mount Lemmon || Mount Lemmon Survey ||  || align=right | 1.4 km || 
|-id=754 bgcolor=#E9E9E9
| 550754 ||  || — || July 28, 2003 || Haleakala || AMOS || EUN || align=right | 1.7 km || 
|-id=755 bgcolor=#fefefe
| 550755 ||  || — || April 2, 2011 || Mount Lemmon || Mount Lemmon Survey || V || align=right data-sort-value="0.59" | 590 m || 
|-id=756 bgcolor=#E9E9E9
| 550756 ||  || — || September 21, 2012 || Kitt Peak || Spacewatch ||  || align=right data-sort-value="0.57" | 570 m || 
|-id=757 bgcolor=#d6d6d6
| 550757 ||  || — || September 16, 2012 || Kitt Peak || Spacewatch ||  || align=right | 2.8 km || 
|-id=758 bgcolor=#E9E9E9
| 550758 ||  || — || October 1, 2008 || Mount Lemmon || Mount Lemmon Survey ||  || align=right data-sort-value="0.49" | 490 m || 
|-id=759 bgcolor=#fefefe
| 550759 ||  || — || October 8, 2002 || Uccle || T. Pauwels ||  || align=right data-sort-value="0.71" | 710 m || 
|-id=760 bgcolor=#d6d6d6
| 550760 ||  || — || September 14, 2012 || ESA OGS || ESA OGS ||  || align=right | 2.7 km || 
|-id=761 bgcolor=#fefefe
| 550761 ||  || — || April 1, 2011 || Kitt Peak || Spacewatch ||  || align=right data-sort-value="0.90" | 900 m || 
|-id=762 bgcolor=#fefefe
| 550762 ||  || — || October 23, 2005 || Catalina || CSS ||  || align=right data-sort-value="0.98" | 980 m || 
|-id=763 bgcolor=#d6d6d6
| 550763 ||  || — || August 24, 2006 || Palomar || NEAT ||  || align=right | 3.4 km || 
|-id=764 bgcolor=#d6d6d6
| 550764 ||  || — || October 5, 2012 || Haleakala || Pan-STARRS ||  || align=right | 3.9 km || 
|-id=765 bgcolor=#d6d6d6
| 550765 ||  || — || October 7, 2012 || Haleakala || Pan-STARRS ||  || align=right | 3.7 km || 
|-id=766 bgcolor=#d6d6d6
| 550766 ||  || — || August 13, 2006 || Palomar || NEAT || TIR || align=right | 4.2 km || 
|-id=767 bgcolor=#E9E9E9
| 550767 ||  || — || September 16, 2012 || Kitt Peak || Spacewatch || (5) || align=right data-sort-value="0.56" | 560 m || 
|-id=768 bgcolor=#fefefe
| 550768 ||  || — || March 28, 2008 || Mount Lemmon || Mount Lemmon Survey ||  || align=right data-sort-value="0.75" | 750 m || 
|-id=769 bgcolor=#d6d6d6
| 550769 ||  || — || October 5, 2012 || Haleakala || Pan-STARRS ||  || align=right | 2.7 km || 
|-id=770 bgcolor=#E9E9E9
| 550770 ||  || — || October 21, 2008 || Mount Lemmon || Mount Lemmon Survey ||  || align=right data-sort-value="0.80" | 800 m || 
|-id=771 bgcolor=#E9E9E9
| 550771 ||  || — || May 24, 2011 || Nogales || M. Schwartz, P. R. Holvorcem ||  || align=right | 1.4 km || 
|-id=772 bgcolor=#d6d6d6
| 550772 ||  || — || May 17, 2005 || Mount Lemmon || Mount Lemmon Survey ||  || align=right | 3.4 km || 
|-id=773 bgcolor=#d6d6d6
| 550773 ||  || — || September 26, 2007 || Mount Lemmon || Mount Lemmon Survey ||  || align=right | 3.5 km || 
|-id=774 bgcolor=#fefefe
| 550774 ||  || — || August 13, 2006 || Palomar || NEAT || H || align=right data-sort-value="0.91" | 910 m || 
|-id=775 bgcolor=#FA8072
| 550775 ||  || — || March 10, 2011 || Mayhill-ISON || L. Elenin || H || align=right data-sort-value="0.94" | 940 m || 
|-id=776 bgcolor=#d6d6d6
| 550776 ||  || — || April 10, 2005 || Kitt Peak || Kitt Peak Obs. ||  || align=right | 2.5 km || 
|-id=777 bgcolor=#fefefe
| 550777 ||  || — || September 15, 2004 || Kitt Peak || Spacewatch || H || align=right data-sort-value="0.75" | 750 m || 
|-id=778 bgcolor=#d6d6d6
| 550778 ||  || — || August 25, 2006 || Lulin || LUSS ||  || align=right | 2.9 km || 
|-id=779 bgcolor=#fefefe
| 550779 ||  || — || October 11, 2012 || Haleakala || Pan-STARRS ||  || align=right data-sort-value="0.78" | 780 m || 
|-id=780 bgcolor=#fefefe
| 550780 ||  || — || September 3, 2008 || Kitt Peak || Spacewatch ||  || align=right data-sort-value="0.94" | 940 m || 
|-id=781 bgcolor=#E9E9E9
| 550781 ||  || — || March 15, 2002 || Mount Hamilton || Lick Obs. ||  || align=right | 1.6 km || 
|-id=782 bgcolor=#d6d6d6
| 550782 ||  || — || April 10, 2005 || Mount Lemmon || Mount Lemmon Survey || THM || align=right | 2.9 km || 
|-id=783 bgcolor=#d6d6d6
| 550783 ||  || — || September 15, 2012 || ESA OGS || ESA OGS ||  || align=right | 2.7 km || 
|-id=784 bgcolor=#fefefe
| 550784 ||  || — || April 8, 2008 || Kitt Peak || Spacewatch ||  || align=right data-sort-value="0.82" | 820 m || 
|-id=785 bgcolor=#E9E9E9
| 550785 ||  || — || October 8, 2012 || Haleakala || Pan-STARRS || (5) || align=right data-sort-value="0.70" | 700 m || 
|-id=786 bgcolor=#d6d6d6
| 550786 ||  || — || March 12, 2010 || Mount Lemmon || Mount Lemmon Survey ||  || align=right | 3.1 km || 
|-id=787 bgcolor=#d6d6d6
| 550787 ||  || — || November 2, 2007 || Kitt Peak || Spacewatch ||  || align=right | 3.1 km || 
|-id=788 bgcolor=#d6d6d6
| 550788 ||  || — || August 10, 2001 || Palomar || NEAT ||  || align=right | 2.8 km || 
|-id=789 bgcolor=#fefefe
| 550789 ||  || — || September 14, 2005 || Kitt Peak || Spacewatch ||  || align=right data-sort-value="0.75" | 750 m || 
|-id=790 bgcolor=#d6d6d6
| 550790 ||  || — || August 18, 2006 || Kitt Peak || Spacewatch ||  || align=right | 2.9 km || 
|-id=791 bgcolor=#fefefe
| 550791 ||  || — || December 10, 2009 || Mount Lemmon || Mount Lemmon Survey ||  || align=right data-sort-value="0.75" | 750 m || 
|-id=792 bgcolor=#d6d6d6
| 550792 ||  || — || October 9, 2012 || Haleakala || Pan-STARRS ||  || align=right | 2.5 km || 
|-id=793 bgcolor=#fefefe
| 550793 ||  || — || October 9, 2012 || Haleakala || Pan-STARRS ||  || align=right data-sort-value="0.90" | 900 m || 
|-id=794 bgcolor=#d6d6d6
| 550794 ||  || — || September 16, 2012 || Kitt Peak || Spacewatch ||  || align=right | 2.7 km || 
|-id=795 bgcolor=#d6d6d6
| 550795 ||  || — || November 3, 2007 || Kitt Peak || Spacewatch ||  || align=right | 3.4 km || 
|-id=796 bgcolor=#fefefe
| 550796 ||  || — || March 11, 2011 || Mount Lemmon || Mount Lemmon Survey ||  || align=right data-sort-value="0.78" | 780 m || 
|-id=797 bgcolor=#E9E9E9
| 550797 ||  || — || September 24, 2012 || Kitt Peak || Spacewatch ||  || align=right | 1.2 km || 
|-id=798 bgcolor=#d6d6d6
| 550798 ||  || — || October 9, 2012 || Kitt Peak || Spacewatch ||  || align=right | 2.5 km || 
|-id=799 bgcolor=#d6d6d6
| 550799 ||  || — || October 9, 2012 || Mount Lemmon || Mount Lemmon Survey || 7:4 || align=right | 3.7 km || 
|-id=800 bgcolor=#fefefe
| 550800 ||  || — || October 9, 2012 || Mount Lemmon || Mount Lemmon Survey ||  || align=right data-sort-value="0.71" | 710 m || 
|}

550801–550900 

|-bgcolor=#E9E9E9
| 550801 ||  || — || September 16, 2012 || Kitt Peak || Spacewatch ||  || align=right data-sort-value="0.86" | 860 m || 
|-id=802 bgcolor=#d6d6d6
| 550802 ||  || — || October 10, 2012 || Mount Lemmon || Mount Lemmon Survey ||  || align=right | 3.5 km || 
|-id=803 bgcolor=#d6d6d6
| 550803 ||  || — || September 24, 1995 || Kitt Peak || Spacewatch ||  || align=right | 2.8 km || 
|-id=804 bgcolor=#fefefe
| 550804 ||  || — || December 4, 2005 || Kitt Peak || Spacewatch ||  || align=right | 1.0 km || 
|-id=805 bgcolor=#d6d6d6
| 550805 ||  || — || September 26, 2012 || Mount Lemmon || Mount Lemmon Survey ||  || align=right | 2.7 km || 
|-id=806 bgcolor=#d6d6d6
| 550806 ||  || — || September 18, 2006 || Goodricke-Pigott || R. A. Tucker ||  || align=right | 4.6 km || 
|-id=807 bgcolor=#E9E9E9
| 550807 ||  || — || July 3, 2003 || Kitt Peak || Spacewatch ||  || align=right | 1.6 km || 
|-id=808 bgcolor=#E9E9E9
| 550808 ||  || — || October 10, 2012 || Kitt Peak || Spacewatch ||  || align=right | 1.4 km || 
|-id=809 bgcolor=#fefefe
| 550809 ||  || — || October 10, 2012 || Haleakala || Pan-STARRS ||  || align=right data-sort-value="0.71" | 710 m || 
|-id=810 bgcolor=#fefefe
| 550810 ||  || — || November 30, 2005 || Kitt Peak || Spacewatch || NYS || align=right data-sort-value="0.52" | 520 m || 
|-id=811 bgcolor=#fefefe
| 550811 ||  || — || October 1, 2005 || Kitt Peak || Spacewatch ||  || align=right data-sort-value="0.78" | 780 m || 
|-id=812 bgcolor=#d6d6d6
| 550812 ||  || — || November 4, 2007 || Mount Lemmon || Mount Lemmon Survey ||  || align=right | 2.2 km || 
|-id=813 bgcolor=#d6d6d6
| 550813 ||  || — || March 18, 2010 || Mount Lemmon || Mount Lemmon Survey ||  || align=right | 3.2 km || 
|-id=814 bgcolor=#fefefe
| 550814 ||  || — || September 19, 2012 || Mount Lemmon || Mount Lemmon Survey ||  || align=right data-sort-value="0.65" | 650 m || 
|-id=815 bgcolor=#d6d6d6
| 550815 ||  || — || October 11, 2012 || Mount Lemmon || Mount Lemmon Survey ||  || align=right | 2.5 km || 
|-id=816 bgcolor=#C2FFFF
| 550816 ||  || — || August 31, 2011 || Haleakala || Pan-STARRS || L5 || align=right | 7.3 km || 
|-id=817 bgcolor=#E9E9E9
| 550817 ||  || — || September 17, 2012 || Kitt Peak || Spacewatch ||  || align=right | 1.3 km || 
|-id=818 bgcolor=#fefefe
| 550818 ||  || — || August 27, 2005 || Anderson Mesa || LONEOS ||  || align=right data-sort-value="0.94" | 940 m || 
|-id=819 bgcolor=#E9E9E9
| 550819 ||  || — || October 13, 2012 || Les Engarouines || L. Bernasconi ||  || align=right | 1.6 km || 
|-id=820 bgcolor=#d6d6d6
| 550820 ||  || — || April 2, 2005 || Kitt Peak || Spacewatch ||  || align=right | 3.7 km || 
|-id=821 bgcolor=#fefefe
| 550821 ||  || — || September 18, 2012 || Kitt Peak || Spacewatch ||  || align=right data-sort-value="0.75" | 750 m || 
|-id=822 bgcolor=#fefefe
| 550822 ||  || — || October 9, 2002 || Kitt Peak || Spacewatch ||  || align=right data-sort-value="0.71" | 710 m || 
|-id=823 bgcolor=#d6d6d6
| 550823 ||  || — || October 14, 2012 || Mount Lemmon || Mount Lemmon Survey ||  || align=right | 2.7 km || 
|-id=824 bgcolor=#E9E9E9
| 550824 ||  || — || November 9, 2004 || Mauna Kea || Mauna Kea Obs. ||  || align=right data-sort-value="0.57" | 570 m || 
|-id=825 bgcolor=#fefefe
| 550825 ||  || — || December 27, 2006 || Mount Lemmon || Mount Lemmon Survey ||  || align=right data-sort-value="0.68" | 680 m || 
|-id=826 bgcolor=#fefefe
| 550826 ||  || — || February 13, 2007 || Mount Lemmon || Mount Lemmon Survey ||  || align=right data-sort-value="0.75" | 750 m || 
|-id=827 bgcolor=#d6d6d6
| 550827 ||  || — || October 14, 2001 || Palomar || NEAT ||  || align=right | 4.3 km || 
|-id=828 bgcolor=#d6d6d6
| 550828 ||  || — || January 31, 2009 || Mount Lemmon || Mount Lemmon Survey ||  || align=right | 3.7 km || 
|-id=829 bgcolor=#fefefe
| 550829 ||  || — || March 14, 2004 || Kitt Peak || Spacewatch ||  || align=right data-sort-value="0.78" | 780 m || 
|-id=830 bgcolor=#d6d6d6
| 550830 ||  || — || August 14, 2001 || Powell || K. Smalley ||  || align=right | 2.9 km || 
|-id=831 bgcolor=#E9E9E9
| 550831 ||  || — || October 7, 2012 || Haleakala || Pan-STARRS ||  || align=right | 1.0 km || 
|-id=832 bgcolor=#E9E9E9
| 550832 ||  || — || July 7, 2007 || Charleston || R. Holmes ||  || align=right | 1.2 km || 
|-id=833 bgcolor=#d6d6d6
| 550833 ||  || — || October 16, 2001 || Palomar || NEAT ||  || align=right | 3.4 km || 
|-id=834 bgcolor=#d6d6d6
| 550834 ||  || — || September 20, 2001 || Socorro || LINEAR ||  || align=right | 3.5 km || 
|-id=835 bgcolor=#d6d6d6
| 550835 ||  || — || October 14, 2001 || Apache Point || SDSS Collaboration ||  || align=right | 3.4 km || 
|-id=836 bgcolor=#fefefe
| 550836 ||  || — || August 28, 2012 || Mount Lemmon || Mount Lemmon Survey ||  || align=right data-sort-value="0.90" | 900 m || 
|-id=837 bgcolor=#E9E9E9
| 550837 ||  || — || September 23, 2012 || Kitt Peak || Spacewatch ||  || align=right | 1.2 km || 
|-id=838 bgcolor=#d6d6d6
| 550838 ||  || — || September 17, 2012 || Kitt Peak || Spacewatch ||  || align=right | 2.9 km || 
|-id=839 bgcolor=#fefefe
| 550839 ||  || — || September 21, 2012 || Catalina || CSS ||  || align=right data-sort-value="0.75" | 750 m || 
|-id=840 bgcolor=#d6d6d6
| 550840 ||  || — || October 11, 2012 || Piszkesteto || K. Sárneczky || EOS || align=right | 1.8 km || 
|-id=841 bgcolor=#fefefe
| 550841 ||  || — || October 15, 2012 || Mount Lemmon || Mount Lemmon Survey ||  || align=right data-sort-value="0.71" | 710 m || 
|-id=842 bgcolor=#E9E9E9
| 550842 ||  || — || September 23, 2008 || Mount Lemmon || Mount Lemmon Survey ||  || align=right data-sort-value="0.68" | 680 m || 
|-id=843 bgcolor=#d6d6d6
| 550843 ||  || — || April 20, 2004 || Kitt Peak || Spacewatch ||  || align=right | 3.0 km || 
|-id=844 bgcolor=#fefefe
| 550844 ||  || — || October 9, 2012 || Haleakala || Pan-STARRS || H || align=right data-sort-value="0.54" | 540 m || 
|-id=845 bgcolor=#E9E9E9
| 550845 ||  || — || November 7, 2008 || Mount Lemmon || Mount Lemmon Survey ||  || align=right data-sort-value="0.92" | 920 m || 
|-id=846 bgcolor=#d6d6d6
| 550846 ||  || — || October 10, 2012 || Mount Lemmon || Mount Lemmon Survey ||  || align=right | 2.4 km || 
|-id=847 bgcolor=#fefefe
| 550847 ||  || — || October 11, 2012 || Haleakala || Pan-STARRS || V || align=right data-sort-value="0.68" | 680 m || 
|-id=848 bgcolor=#FA8072
| 550848 ||  || — || March 28, 2011 || Kitt Peak || Spacewatch || H || align=right data-sort-value="0.43" | 430 m || 
|-id=849 bgcolor=#d6d6d6
| 550849 ||  || — || October 11, 2012 || Mount Lemmon || Mount Lemmon Survey ||  || align=right | 2.8 km || 
|-id=850 bgcolor=#E9E9E9
| 550850 ||  || — || August 4, 2003 || Kitt Peak || Spacewatch ||  || align=right | 2.2 km || 
|-id=851 bgcolor=#d6d6d6
| 550851 ||  || — || January 4, 2003 || Kitt Peak || I. dell'Antonio, D. Loomba ||  || align=right | 3.5 km || 
|-id=852 bgcolor=#E9E9E9
| 550852 ||  || — || September 21, 2003 || Palomar || NEAT ||  || align=right | 1.8 km || 
|-id=853 bgcolor=#fefefe
| 550853 ||  || — || January 28, 2000 || Kitt Peak || Spacewatch ||  || align=right data-sort-value="0.82" | 820 m || 
|-id=854 bgcolor=#fefefe
| 550854 ||  || — || October 1, 2005 || Catalina || CSS ||  || align=right data-sort-value="0.82" | 820 m || 
|-id=855 bgcolor=#d6d6d6
| 550855 ||  || — || October 14, 2012 || Kitt Peak || Spacewatch ||  || align=right | 2.9 km || 
|-id=856 bgcolor=#fefefe
| 550856 ||  || — || September 30, 2005 || Palomar || NEAT ||  || align=right data-sort-value="0.96" | 960 m || 
|-id=857 bgcolor=#fefefe
| 550857 ||  || — || September 12, 2001 || Kitt Peak || Spacewatch ||  || align=right data-sort-value="0.90" | 900 m || 
|-id=858 bgcolor=#d6d6d6
| 550858 ||  || — || October 8, 2012 || Mount Lemmon || Mount Lemmon Survey ||  || align=right | 2.8 km || 
|-id=859 bgcolor=#d6d6d6
| 550859 ||  || — || April 13, 2004 || Palomar || NEAT ||  || align=right | 3.9 km || 
|-id=860 bgcolor=#E9E9E9
| 550860 ||  || — || October 6, 2012 || Kitt Peak || Spacewatch ||  || align=right | 1.2 km || 
|-id=861 bgcolor=#E9E9E9
| 550861 ||  || — || November 1, 2008 || Mount Lemmon || Mount Lemmon Survey ||  || align=right data-sort-value="0.68" | 680 m || 
|-id=862 bgcolor=#fefefe
| 550862 ||  || — || October 10, 2001 || Palomar || NEAT ||  || align=right | 1.1 km || 
|-id=863 bgcolor=#fefefe
| 550863 ||  || — || August 6, 2005 || Palomar || NEAT ||  || align=right data-sort-value="0.78" | 780 m || 
|-id=864 bgcolor=#fefefe
| 550864 ||  || — || September 19, 2001 || Kitt Peak || Spacewatch ||  || align=right data-sort-value="0.98" | 980 m || 
|-id=865 bgcolor=#d6d6d6
| 550865 ||  || — || September 23, 2012 || Mayhill-ISON || L. Elenin ||  || align=right | 2.9 km || 
|-id=866 bgcolor=#d6d6d6
| 550866 ||  || — || September 23, 2006 || San Marcello || Pistoia Mountains Obs. || VER || align=right | 3.2 km || 
|-id=867 bgcolor=#fefefe
| 550867 ||  || — || September 15, 2012 || Kitt Peak || Spacewatch ||  || align=right data-sort-value="0.65" | 650 m || 
|-id=868 bgcolor=#fefefe
| 550868 ||  || — || October 10, 2012 || Mount Lemmon || Mount Lemmon Survey ||  || align=right data-sort-value="0.75" | 750 m || 
|-id=869 bgcolor=#fefefe
| 550869 ||  || — || September 17, 2012 || Kitt Peak || Spacewatch || H || align=right data-sort-value="0.62" | 620 m || 
|-id=870 bgcolor=#fefefe
| 550870 ||  || — || December 8, 2005 || Kitt Peak || Spacewatch ||  || align=right data-sort-value="0.78" | 780 m || 
|-id=871 bgcolor=#d6d6d6
| 550871 ||  || — || August 17, 2006 || Palomar || NEAT ||  || align=right | 3.4 km || 
|-id=872 bgcolor=#d6d6d6
| 550872 ||  || — || September 30, 2006 || Catalina || CSS ||  || align=right | 4.2 km || 
|-id=873 bgcolor=#fefefe
| 550873 ||  || — || September 19, 1998 || Apache Point || SDSS Collaboration ||  || align=right | 1.0 km || 
|-id=874 bgcolor=#fefefe
| 550874 ||  || — || March 12, 2003 || Kitt Peak || Spacewatch ||  || align=right | 1.0 km || 
|-id=875 bgcolor=#d6d6d6
| 550875 ||  || — || September 19, 2006 || Catalina || CSS ||  || align=right | 3.7 km || 
|-id=876 bgcolor=#fefefe
| 550876 ||  || — || March 11, 2007 || Kitt Peak || Spacewatch ||  || align=right | 1.0 km || 
|-id=877 bgcolor=#d6d6d6
| 550877 ||  || — || October 22, 2001 || Palomar || NEAT || TIR || align=right | 3.8 km || 
|-id=878 bgcolor=#E9E9E9
| 550878 ||  || — || December 20, 2004 || Mount Lemmon || Mount Lemmon Survey ||  || align=right | 2.9 km || 
|-id=879 bgcolor=#fefefe
| 550879 ||  || — || July 28, 2005 || Palomar || NEAT ||  || align=right data-sort-value="0.82" | 820 m || 
|-id=880 bgcolor=#E9E9E9
| 550880 ||  || — || September 17, 2012 || Nogales || M. Schwartz, P. R. Holvorcem ||  || align=right data-sort-value="0.90" | 900 m || 
|-id=881 bgcolor=#FA8072
| 550881 ||  || — || October 13, 2012 || Catalina || CSS || H || align=right data-sort-value="0.63" | 630 m || 
|-id=882 bgcolor=#E9E9E9
| 550882 ||  || — || September 13, 2012 || ASC-Kislovodsk || ASC-Kislovodsk || EUN || align=right | 1.1 km || 
|-id=883 bgcolor=#E9E9E9
| 550883 ||  || — || October 15, 2012 || Catalina || CSS ||  || align=right | 1.6 km || 
|-id=884 bgcolor=#d6d6d6
| 550884 ||  || — || October 9, 2012 || Haleakala || Pan-STARRS ||  || align=right | 2.5 km || 
|-id=885 bgcolor=#d6d6d6
| 550885 ||  || — || October 8, 2012 || Haleakala || Pan-STARRS ||  || align=right | 3.2 km || 
|-id=886 bgcolor=#E9E9E9
| 550886 ||  || — || August 4, 2003 || Kitt Peak || Spacewatch ||  || align=right | 1.3 km || 
|-id=887 bgcolor=#d6d6d6
| 550887 ||  || — || September 5, 2000 || Apache Point || SDSS Collaboration ||  || align=right | 2.5 km || 
|-id=888 bgcolor=#fefefe
| 550888 ||  || — || October 11, 2012 || Kitt Peak || Spacewatch ||  || align=right data-sort-value="0.71" | 710 m || 
|-id=889 bgcolor=#fefefe
| 550889 ||  || — || December 1, 2005 || Mount Lemmon || Mount Lemmon Survey ||  || align=right data-sort-value="0.75" | 750 m || 
|-id=890 bgcolor=#E9E9E9
| 550890 ||  || — || October 6, 2012 || Haleakala || Pan-STARRS ||  || align=right | 1.0 km || 
|-id=891 bgcolor=#E9E9E9
| 550891 ||  || — || October 4, 2016 || Mount Lemmon || Mount Lemmon Survey ||  || align=right data-sort-value="0.79" | 790 m || 
|-id=892 bgcolor=#d6d6d6
| 550892 ||  || — || October 26, 2013 || Mount Lemmon || Mount Lemmon Survey || 7:4 || align=right | 3.9 km || 
|-id=893 bgcolor=#d6d6d6
| 550893 ||  || — || December 21, 2014 || Mount Lemmon || Mount Lemmon Survey ||  || align=right | 3.3 km || 
|-id=894 bgcolor=#E9E9E9
| 550894 ||  || — || January 1, 2014 || Kitt Peak || Spacewatch ||  || align=right data-sort-value="0.76" | 760 m || 
|-id=895 bgcolor=#fefefe
| 550895 ||  || — || October 8, 2012 || Kitt Peak || Spacewatch ||  || align=right data-sort-value="0.62" | 620 m || 
|-id=896 bgcolor=#d6d6d6
| 550896 ||  || — || October 5, 2012 || Haleakala || Pan-STARRS ||  || align=right | 2.8 km || 
|-id=897 bgcolor=#E9E9E9
| 550897 ||  || — || September 18, 2012 || Kitt Peak || Spacewatch ||  || align=right | 1.3 km || 
|-id=898 bgcolor=#fefefe
| 550898 ||  || — || November 5, 2005 || Catalina || CSS || V || align=right data-sort-value="0.74" | 740 m || 
|-id=899 bgcolor=#fefefe
| 550899 ||  || — || July 29, 2005 || Palomar || NEAT ||  || align=right data-sort-value="0.90" | 900 m || 
|-id=900 bgcolor=#fefefe
| 550900 ||  || — || October 7, 2012 || Haleakala || Pan-STARRS ||  || align=right data-sort-value="0.54" | 540 m || 
|}

550901–551000 

|-bgcolor=#fefefe
| 550901 ||  || — || April 6, 2008 || Mount Lemmon || Mount Lemmon Survey ||  || align=right data-sort-value="0.59" | 590 m || 
|-id=902 bgcolor=#d6d6d6
| 550902 ||  || — || October 24, 2007 || Mount Lemmon || Mount Lemmon Survey ||  || align=right | 4.2 km || 
|-id=903 bgcolor=#d6d6d6
| 550903 ||  || — || October 16, 2012 || Mount Lemmon || Mount Lemmon Survey ||  || align=right | 2.6 km || 
|-id=904 bgcolor=#fefefe
| 550904 ||  || — || August 24, 2005 || Palomar || NEAT ||  || align=right data-sort-value="0.66" | 660 m || 
|-id=905 bgcolor=#fefefe
| 550905 ||  || — || October 8, 2012 || Mount Lemmon || Mount Lemmon Survey ||  || align=right data-sort-value="0.73" | 730 m || 
|-id=906 bgcolor=#fefefe
| 550906 ||  || — || October 8, 2012 || Haleakala || Pan-STARRS || (2076) || align=right data-sort-value="0.82" | 820 m || 
|-id=907 bgcolor=#fefefe
| 550907 ||  || — || October 8, 2012 || Haleakala || Pan-STARRS ||  || align=right data-sort-value="0.68" | 680 m || 
|-id=908 bgcolor=#E9E9E9
| 550908 ||  || — || October 27, 2008 || Kitt Peak || Spacewatch ||  || align=right data-sort-value="0.78" | 780 m || 
|-id=909 bgcolor=#E9E9E9
| 550909 ||  || — || October 17, 2012 || Mount Lemmon || Mount Lemmon Survey ||  || align=right | 1.6 km || 
|-id=910 bgcolor=#E9E9E9
| 550910 ||  || — || October 17, 2012 || Mount Lemmon || Mount Lemmon Survey ||  || align=right | 1.5 km || 
|-id=911 bgcolor=#d6d6d6
| 550911 ||  || — || November 17, 2007 || Kitt Peak || Spacewatch ||  || align=right | 3.1 km || 
|-id=912 bgcolor=#fefefe
| 550912 ||  || — || October 8, 2012 || Catalina || CSS ||  || align=right data-sort-value="0.68" | 680 m || 
|-id=913 bgcolor=#d6d6d6
| 550913 ||  || — || October 17, 2012 || Mount Lemmon || Mount Lemmon Survey ||  || align=right | 2.8 km || 
|-id=914 bgcolor=#fefefe
| 550914 ||  || — || September 21, 2012 || Mount Lemmon || Mount Lemmon Survey ||  || align=right data-sort-value="0.68" | 680 m || 
|-id=915 bgcolor=#E9E9E9
| 550915 ||  || — || October 10, 2012 || Mount Lemmon || Mount Lemmon Survey ||  || align=right data-sort-value="0.98" | 980 m || 
|-id=916 bgcolor=#C2FFFF
| 550916 ||  || — || October 20, 2012 || Mount Lemmon || Mount Lemmon Survey || L4 || align=right | 13 km || 
|-id=917 bgcolor=#fefefe
| 550917 ||  || — || July 18, 2001 || Palomar || NEAT ||  || align=right data-sort-value="0.94" | 940 m || 
|-id=918 bgcolor=#d6d6d6
| 550918 ||  || — || October 3, 2006 || Mount Lemmon || Mount Lemmon Survey ||  || align=right | 3.2 km || 
|-id=919 bgcolor=#d6d6d6
| 550919 ||  || — || November 19, 2007 || Kitt Peak || Spacewatch || THM || align=right | 2.2 km || 
|-id=920 bgcolor=#fefefe
| 550920 ||  || — || March 9, 2007 || Mount Lemmon || Mount Lemmon Survey ||  || align=right data-sort-value="0.62" | 620 m || 
|-id=921 bgcolor=#fefefe
| 550921 ||  || — || September 25, 2001 || Bohyunsan || Bohyunsan Obs. ||  || align=right data-sort-value="0.86" | 860 m || 
|-id=922 bgcolor=#d6d6d6
| 550922 ||  || — || October 18, 2012 || Mount Lemmon || Mount Lemmon Survey ||  || align=right | 3.4 km || 
|-id=923 bgcolor=#d6d6d6
| 550923 ||  || — || October 18, 2012 || Mount Lemmon || Mount Lemmon Survey ||  || align=right | 4.0 km || 
|-id=924 bgcolor=#d6d6d6
| 550924 ||  || — || April 10, 2005 || Mount Lemmon || Mount Lemmon Survey ||  || align=right | 3.2 km || 
|-id=925 bgcolor=#d6d6d6
| 550925 ||  || — || May 14, 2009 || Mount Lemmon || Mount Lemmon Survey ||  || align=right | 4.0 km || 
|-id=926 bgcolor=#fefefe
| 550926 ||  || — || March 15, 2011 || Mount Lemmon || Mount Lemmon Survey || H || align=right data-sort-value="0.68" | 680 m || 
|-id=927 bgcolor=#fefefe
| 550927 ||  || — || November 3, 2005 || Catalina || CSS ||  || align=right data-sort-value="0.90" | 900 m || 
|-id=928 bgcolor=#d6d6d6
| 550928 ||  || — || September 28, 2006 || Catalina || CSS ||  || align=right | 4.4 km || 
|-id=929 bgcolor=#FA8072
| 550929 ||  || — || October 30, 2007 || Mount Lemmon || Mount Lemmon Survey || H || align=right data-sort-value="0.47" | 470 m || 
|-id=930 bgcolor=#d6d6d6
| 550930 ||  || — || November 15, 2001 || Kitt Peak || Spacewatch ||  || align=right | 3.4 km || 
|-id=931 bgcolor=#E9E9E9
| 550931 ||  || — || October 19, 2012 || Haleakala || Pan-STARRS ||  || align=right | 1.3 km || 
|-id=932 bgcolor=#fefefe
| 550932 ||  || — || October 19, 2012 || Haleakala || Pan-STARRS ||  || align=right data-sort-value="0.68" | 680 m || 
|-id=933 bgcolor=#fefefe
| 550933 ||  || — || October 19, 2012 || Haleakala || Pan-STARRS ||  || align=right data-sort-value="0.78" | 780 m || 
|-id=934 bgcolor=#d6d6d6
| 550934 ||  || — || October 8, 2012 || Mount Lemmon || Mount Lemmon Survey ||  || align=right | 2.5 km || 
|-id=935 bgcolor=#E9E9E9
| 550935 ||  || — || November 20, 2008 || Kitt Peak || Spacewatch ||  || align=right data-sort-value="0.71" | 710 m || 
|-id=936 bgcolor=#fefefe
| 550936 ||  || — || October 19, 2012 || Haleakala || Pan-STARRS || V || align=right data-sort-value="0.59" | 590 m || 
|-id=937 bgcolor=#fefefe
| 550937 ||  || — || October 19, 2012 || Haleakala || Pan-STARRS || H || align=right data-sort-value="0.52" | 520 m || 
|-id=938 bgcolor=#fefefe
| 550938 ||  || — || October 20, 2012 || Haleakala || Pan-STARRS || H || align=right data-sort-value="0.52" | 520 m || 
|-id=939 bgcolor=#E9E9E9
| 550939 ||  || — || September 23, 2012 || Mount Lemmon || Mount Lemmon Survey ||  || align=right | 1.0 km || 
|-id=940 bgcolor=#fefefe
| 550940 ||  || — || December 1, 2005 || Kitt Peak || Spacewatch ||  || align=right data-sort-value="0.78" | 780 m || 
|-id=941 bgcolor=#d6d6d6
| 550941 ||  || — || November 19, 2006 || Kitt Peak || Spacewatch || 7:4 || align=right | 3.9 km || 
|-id=942 bgcolor=#d6d6d6
| 550942 ||  || — || October 20, 2012 || Piszkesteto || A. Király ||  || align=right | 3.4 km || 
|-id=943 bgcolor=#fefefe
| 550943 ||  || — || October 11, 2012 || Haleakala || Pan-STARRS || H || align=right data-sort-value="0.65" | 650 m || 
|-id=944 bgcolor=#fefefe
| 550944 ||  || — || September 3, 2002 || Palomar || NEAT ||  || align=right data-sort-value="0.90" | 900 m || 
|-id=945 bgcolor=#d6d6d6
| 550945 ||  || — || March 18, 2010 || Kitt Peak || Spacewatch ||  || align=right | 2.5 km || 
|-id=946 bgcolor=#E9E9E9
| 550946 ||  || — || March 5, 2006 || Kitt Peak || Spacewatch ||  || align=right | 1.3 km || 
|-id=947 bgcolor=#E9E9E9
| 550947 ||  || — || October 17, 2012 || Haleakala || Pan-STARRS ||  || align=right data-sort-value="0.96" | 960 m || 
|-id=948 bgcolor=#E9E9E9
| 550948 ||  || — || October 23, 2008 || Kitt Peak || Spacewatch ||  || align=right | 1.1 km || 
|-id=949 bgcolor=#fefefe
| 550949 ||  || — || October 8, 2012 || Mount Lemmon || Mount Lemmon Survey || MAS || align=right data-sort-value="0.59" | 590 m || 
|-id=950 bgcolor=#fefefe
| 550950 ||  || — || January 5, 2006 || Kitt Peak || Spacewatch || MAS || align=right data-sort-value="0.54" | 540 m || 
|-id=951 bgcolor=#d6d6d6
| 550951 ||  || — || August 21, 2001 || Palomar || NEAT ||  || align=right | 4.0 km || 
|-id=952 bgcolor=#E9E9E9
| 550952 ||  || — || October 10, 2012 || Kitt Peak || Spacewatch ||  || align=right | 1.7 km || 
|-id=953 bgcolor=#d6d6d6
| 550953 ||  || — || April 10, 2010 || Kitt Peak || Spacewatch ||  || align=right | 3.9 km || 
|-id=954 bgcolor=#d6d6d6
| 550954 ||  || — || May 4, 2005 || Mauna Kea || Mauna Kea Obs. || THM || align=right | 2.0 km || 
|-id=955 bgcolor=#E9E9E9
| 550955 ||  || — || August 22, 2003 || Palomar || NEAT ||  || align=right | 1.5 km || 
|-id=956 bgcolor=#fefefe
| 550956 ||  || — || November 2, 2005 || Mount Lemmon || Mount Lemmon Survey ||  || align=right data-sort-value="0.94" | 940 m || 
|-id=957 bgcolor=#fefefe
| 550957 ||  || — || November 19, 2009 || Kitt Peak || Spacewatch ||  || align=right data-sort-value="0.82" | 820 m || 
|-id=958 bgcolor=#E9E9E9
| 550958 ||  || — || October 30, 2008 || Kitt Peak || Spacewatch ||  || align=right data-sort-value="0.54" | 540 m || 
|-id=959 bgcolor=#E9E9E9
| 550959 ||  || — || November 3, 2008 || Kitt Peak || Spacewatch ||  || align=right data-sort-value="0.75" | 750 m || 
|-id=960 bgcolor=#E9E9E9
| 550960 ||  || — || November 6, 2008 || Mount Lemmon || Mount Lemmon Survey ||  || align=right | 1.2 km || 
|-id=961 bgcolor=#fefefe
| 550961 ||  || — || May 24, 2011 || Haleakala || Pan-STARRS ||  || align=right | 1.1 km || 
|-id=962 bgcolor=#d6d6d6
| 550962 ||  || — || January 10, 2003 || Palomar || NEAT ||  || align=right | 3.7 km || 
|-id=963 bgcolor=#d6d6d6
| 550963 ||  || — || October 22, 2012 || Mount Lemmon || Mount Lemmon Survey ||  || align=right | 2.2 km || 
|-id=964 bgcolor=#fefefe
| 550964 ||  || — || September 17, 2012 || Kitt Peak || Spacewatch ||  || align=right data-sort-value="0.82" | 820 m || 
|-id=965 bgcolor=#d6d6d6
| 550965 ||  || — || September 16, 2012 || Kitt Peak || Spacewatch ||  || align=right | 2.8 km || 
|-id=966 bgcolor=#d6d6d6
| 550966 ||  || — || December 1, 2007 || Bisei SG Center || K. Nishiyama, N. Hashimoto ||  || align=right | 2.9 km || 
|-id=967 bgcolor=#fefefe
| 550967 ||  || — || April 9, 2003 || Palomar || NEAT || V || align=right data-sort-value="0.78" | 780 m || 
|-id=968 bgcolor=#fefefe
| 550968 ||  || — || July 28, 2005 || Palomar || NEAT ||  || align=right data-sort-value="0.62" | 620 m || 
|-id=969 bgcolor=#fefefe
| 550969 ||  || — || September 29, 2005 || Mount Lemmon || Mount Lemmon Survey ||  || align=right data-sort-value="0.75" | 750 m || 
|-id=970 bgcolor=#fefefe
| 550970 ||  || — || January 30, 2006 || Kitt Peak || Spacewatch ||  || align=right data-sort-value="0.65" | 650 m || 
|-id=971 bgcolor=#fefefe
| 550971 ||  || — || November 9, 2001 || Kitt Peak || Spacewatch ||  || align=right data-sort-value="0.78" | 780 m || 
|-id=972 bgcolor=#fefefe
| 550972 ||  || — || April 7, 2007 || Mount Lemmon || Mount Lemmon Survey ||  || align=right | 1.0 km || 
|-id=973 bgcolor=#E9E9E9
| 550973 ||  || — || October 22, 2012 || Haleakala || Pan-STARRS ||  || align=right | 1.4 km || 
|-id=974 bgcolor=#d6d6d6
| 550974 ||  || — || October 18, 2012 || Mount Lemmon || Mount Lemmon Survey ||  || align=right | 3.7 km || 
|-id=975 bgcolor=#E9E9E9
| 550975 ||  || — || September 26, 2012 || Nogales || M. Schwartz, P. R. Holvorcem ||  || align=right | 1.0 km || 
|-id=976 bgcolor=#E9E9E9
| 550976 ||  || — || October 19, 2012 || Mount Lemmon || Mount Lemmon Survey ||  || align=right | 1.5 km || 
|-id=977 bgcolor=#fefefe
| 550977 ||  || — || October 19, 2012 || Haleakala || Pan-STARRS || H || align=right data-sort-value="0.62" | 620 m || 
|-id=978 bgcolor=#d6d6d6
| 550978 ||  || — || October 6, 2012 || Haleakala || Pan-STARRS ||  || align=right | 3.1 km || 
|-id=979 bgcolor=#d6d6d6
| 550979 ||  || — || October 6, 2012 || Haleakala || Pan-STARRS || 7:4 || align=right | 4.6 km || 
|-id=980 bgcolor=#fefefe
| 550980 ||  || — || October 23, 2012 || Kitt Peak || Spacewatch ||  || align=right data-sort-value="0.78" | 780 m || 
|-id=981 bgcolor=#E9E9E9
| 550981 ||  || — || December 31, 2008 || Mount Lemmon || Mount Lemmon Survey ||  || align=right data-sort-value="0.86" | 860 m || 
|-id=982 bgcolor=#fefefe
| 550982 ||  || — || October 14, 2012 || ASC-Kislovodsk || V. Nevski, O. Zeloyniy || H || align=right data-sort-value="0.65" | 650 m || 
|-id=983 bgcolor=#d6d6d6
| 550983 ||  || — || March 25, 2010 || Kitt Peak || Spacewatch ||  || align=right | 2.8 km || 
|-id=984 bgcolor=#fefefe
| 550984 ||  || — || April 13, 2011 || Mount Lemmon || Mount Lemmon Survey ||  || align=right data-sort-value="0.78" | 780 m || 
|-id=985 bgcolor=#E9E9E9
| 550985 ||  || — || April 20, 2010 || Mount Lemmon || Mount Lemmon Survey ||  || align=right | 1.2 km || 
|-id=986 bgcolor=#E9E9E9
| 550986 ||  || — || October 28, 2008 || Kitt Peak || Spacewatch ||  || align=right data-sort-value="0.67" | 670 m || 
|-id=987 bgcolor=#d6d6d6
| 550987 ||  || — || October 8, 2012 || Haleakala || Pan-STARRS ||  || align=right | 2.4 km || 
|-id=988 bgcolor=#E9E9E9
| 550988 ||  || — || January 22, 2006 || Mount Lemmon || Mount Lemmon Survey ||  || align=right | 1.8 km || 
|-id=989 bgcolor=#E9E9E9
| 550989 ||  || — || June 5, 2011 || Mount Lemmon || Mount Lemmon Survey ||  || align=right | 1.7 km || 
|-id=990 bgcolor=#fefefe
| 550990 ||  || — || September 18, 2001 || Apache Point || SDSS Collaboration ||  || align=right data-sort-value="0.78" | 780 m || 
|-id=991 bgcolor=#E9E9E9
| 550991 ||  || — || August 28, 2012 || Mount Lemmon || Mount Lemmon Survey ||  || align=right | 1.2 km || 
|-id=992 bgcolor=#fefefe
| 550992 ||  || — || April 1, 2003 || Kitt Peak || M. W. Buie, A. B. Jordan ||  || align=right data-sort-value="0.78" | 780 m || 
|-id=993 bgcolor=#fefefe
| 550993 ||  || — || March 11, 2003 || Palomar || NEAT || V || align=right data-sort-value="0.89" | 890 m || 
|-id=994 bgcolor=#d6d6d6
| 550994 ||  || — || September 28, 2006 || Kitt Peak || Spacewatch ||  || align=right | 2.7 km || 
|-id=995 bgcolor=#d6d6d6
| 550995 ||  || — || October 5, 2000 || Kitt Peak || Spacewatch || (1118) || align=right | 4.0 km || 
|-id=996 bgcolor=#fefefe
| 550996 ||  || — || December 29, 2005 || Kitt Peak || Spacewatch ||  || align=right data-sort-value="0.78" | 780 m || 
|-id=997 bgcolor=#E9E9E9
| 550997 ||  || — || October 9, 2012 || Mayhill-ISON || L. Elenin ||  || align=right | 1.1 km || 
|-id=998 bgcolor=#E9E9E9
| 550998 ||  || — || September 25, 2008 || Mount Lemmon || Mount Lemmon Survey ||  || align=right | 1.1 km || 
|-id=999 bgcolor=#fefefe
| 550999 ||  || — || October 6, 2012 || Haleakala || Pan-STARRS ||  || align=right | 1.0 km || 
|-id=000 bgcolor=#d6d6d6
| 551000 ||  || — || May 29, 2003 || Cerro Tololo || M. W. Buie, K. J. Meech || TIR || align=right | 2.8 km || 
|}

References

External links 
 Discovery Circumstances: Numbered Minor Planets (550001)–(555000) (IAU Minor Planet Center)

0550